

383001–383100 

|-bgcolor=#d6d6d6
| 383001 ||  || — || May 14, 2005 || Kitt Peak || Spacewatch || EOS || align=right | 2.6 km || 
|-id=002 bgcolor=#d6d6d6
| 383002 ||  || — || May 13, 2005 || Kitt Peak || Spacewatch || — || align=right | 4.1 km || 
|-id=003 bgcolor=#d6d6d6
| 383003 ||  || — || May 3, 2005 || Kitt Peak || Spacewatch || ELF || align=right | 4.3 km || 
|-id=004 bgcolor=#d6d6d6
| 383004 ||  || — || June 1, 2005 || Mount Lemmon || Mount Lemmon Survey || — || align=right | 3.1 km || 
|-id=005 bgcolor=#fefefe
| 383005 ||  || — || June 3, 2005 || Catalina || CSS || — || align=right | 1.0 km || 
|-id=006 bgcolor=#FA8072
| 383006 ||  || — || June 8, 2005 || Kitt Peak || Spacewatch || — || align=right data-sort-value="0.89" | 890 m || 
|-id=007 bgcolor=#d6d6d6
| 383007 ||  || — || June 11, 2005 || Kitt Peak || Spacewatch || — || align=right | 3.1 km || 
|-id=008 bgcolor=#fefefe
| 383008 ||  || — || June 14, 2005 || Mount Lemmon || Mount Lemmon Survey || NYS || align=right data-sort-value="0.75" | 750 m || 
|-id=009 bgcolor=#d6d6d6
| 383009 ||  || — || June 27, 2005 || Kitt Peak || Spacewatch || — || align=right | 3.0 km || 
|-id=010 bgcolor=#fefefe
| 383010 ||  || — || June 29, 2005 || Catalina || CSS || PHO || align=right | 1.8 km || 
|-id=011 bgcolor=#fefefe
| 383011 ||  || — || June 27, 2005 || Kitt Peak || Spacewatch || V || align=right data-sort-value="0.76" | 760 m || 
|-id=012 bgcolor=#fefefe
| 383012 ||  || — || June 29, 2005 || Kitt Peak || Spacewatch || — || align=right data-sort-value="0.96" | 960 m || 
|-id=013 bgcolor=#fefefe
| 383013 ||  || — || June 29, 2005 || Palomar || NEAT || — || align=right data-sort-value="0.98" | 980 m || 
|-id=014 bgcolor=#d6d6d6
| 383014 ||  || — || June 30, 2005 || Palomar || NEAT || — || align=right | 2.5 km || 
|-id=015 bgcolor=#d6d6d6
| 383015 ||  || — || June 30, 2005 || Kitt Peak || Spacewatch || EOS || align=right | 2.6 km || 
|-id=016 bgcolor=#fefefe
| 383016 ||  || — || June 28, 2005 || Palomar || NEAT || ERI || align=right | 2.1 km || 
|-id=017 bgcolor=#fefefe
| 383017 ||  || — || June 29, 2005 || Palomar || NEAT || NYS || align=right data-sort-value="0.88" | 880 m || 
|-id=018 bgcolor=#fefefe
| 383018 ||  || — || June 30, 2005 || Kitt Peak || Spacewatch || V || align=right data-sort-value="0.80" | 800 m || 
|-id=019 bgcolor=#d6d6d6
| 383019 ||  || — || July 1, 2005 || Kitt Peak || Spacewatch || TIR || align=right | 2.9 km || 
|-id=020 bgcolor=#fefefe
| 383020 ||  || — || July 2, 2005 || Kitt Peak || Spacewatch || MAS || align=right data-sort-value="0.75" | 750 m || 
|-id=021 bgcolor=#fefefe
| 383021 ||  || — || July 4, 2005 || Socorro || LINEAR || — || align=right | 1.2 km || 
|-id=022 bgcolor=#fefefe
| 383022 ||  || — || June 16, 2005 || Kitt Peak || Spacewatch || — || align=right | 1.1 km || 
|-id=023 bgcolor=#fefefe
| 383023 ||  || — || July 5, 2005 || Palomar || NEAT || — || align=right data-sort-value="0.93" | 930 m || 
|-id=024 bgcolor=#fefefe
| 383024 ||  || — || July 5, 2005 || Mount Lemmon || Mount Lemmon Survey || — || align=right data-sort-value="0.85" | 850 m || 
|-id=025 bgcolor=#d6d6d6
| 383025 ||  || — || July 10, 2005 || Kitt Peak || Spacewatch || — || align=right | 2.6 km || 
|-id=026 bgcolor=#fefefe
| 383026 ||  || — || July 11, 2005 || Kitt Peak || Spacewatch || — || align=right data-sort-value="0.83" | 830 m || 
|-id=027 bgcolor=#fefefe
| 383027 ||  || — || July 9, 2005 || Kitt Peak || Spacewatch || MAS || align=right data-sort-value="0.75" | 750 m || 
|-id=028 bgcolor=#fefefe
| 383028 ||  || — || July 10, 2005 || Kitt Peak || Spacewatch || V || align=right data-sort-value="0.68" | 680 m || 
|-id=029 bgcolor=#d6d6d6
| 383029 ||  || — || July 9, 2005 || Kitt Peak || Spacewatch || TIR || align=right | 3.0 km || 
|-id=030 bgcolor=#fefefe
| 383030 ||  || — || July 9, 2005 || Kitt Peak || Spacewatch || NYS || align=right data-sort-value="0.78" | 780 m || 
|-id=031 bgcolor=#fefefe
| 383031 ||  || — || July 4, 2005 || Siding Spring || SSS || PHO || align=right | 1.1 km || 
|-id=032 bgcolor=#fefefe
| 383032 ||  || — || July 28, 2005 || Palomar || NEAT || MAS || align=right data-sort-value="0.77" | 770 m || 
|-id=033 bgcolor=#fefefe
| 383033 ||  || — || July 26, 2005 || Palomar || NEAT || — || align=right data-sort-value="0.82" | 820 m || 
|-id=034 bgcolor=#fefefe
| 383034 ||  || — || August 10, 2005 || Cerro Tololo || M. W. Buie || MAS || align=right data-sort-value="0.86" | 860 m || 
|-id=035 bgcolor=#fefefe
| 383035 ||  || — || August 24, 2005 || Palomar || NEAT || — || align=right | 1.2 km || 
|-id=036 bgcolor=#fefefe
| 383036 ||  || — || August 24, 2005 || Palomar || NEAT || — || align=right data-sort-value="0.89" | 890 m || 
|-id=037 bgcolor=#fefefe
| 383037 ||  || — || August 24, 2005 || Palomar || NEAT || MAS || align=right data-sort-value="0.75" | 750 m || 
|-id=038 bgcolor=#fefefe
| 383038 ||  || — || August 24, 2005 || Palomar || NEAT || — || align=right data-sort-value="0.95" | 950 m || 
|-id=039 bgcolor=#fefefe
| 383039 ||  || — || August 25, 2005 || Palomar || NEAT || MAS || align=right data-sort-value="0.83" | 830 m || 
|-id=040 bgcolor=#fefefe
| 383040 ||  || — || August 26, 2005 || Campo Imperatore || CINEOS || NYS || align=right data-sort-value="0.76" | 760 m || 
|-id=041 bgcolor=#d6d6d6
| 383041 ||  || — || August 25, 2005 || Palomar || NEAT || EUP || align=right | 5.8 km || 
|-id=042 bgcolor=#fefefe
| 383042 ||  || — || August 26, 2005 || Palomar || NEAT || — || align=right data-sort-value="0.92" | 920 m || 
|-id=043 bgcolor=#fefefe
| 383043 ||  || — || August 26, 2005 || Palomar || NEAT || NYS || align=right data-sort-value="0.67" | 670 m || 
|-id=044 bgcolor=#fefefe
| 383044 ||  || — || August 27, 2005 || Anderson Mesa || LONEOS || — || align=right | 1.1 km || 
|-id=045 bgcolor=#fefefe
| 383045 ||  || — || August 28, 2005 || Kitt Peak || Spacewatch || NYS || align=right data-sort-value="0.83" | 830 m || 
|-id=046 bgcolor=#fefefe
| 383046 ||  || — || August 24, 2005 || Palomar || NEAT || V || align=right data-sort-value="0.92" | 920 m || 
|-id=047 bgcolor=#fefefe
| 383047 ||  || — || August 25, 2005 || Palomar || NEAT || MAS || align=right data-sort-value="0.82" | 820 m || 
|-id=048 bgcolor=#fefefe
| 383048 ||  || — || August 26, 2005 || Palomar || NEAT || V || align=right data-sort-value="0.58" | 580 m || 
|-id=049 bgcolor=#fefefe
| 383049 ||  || — || August 26, 2005 || Palomar || NEAT || — || align=right data-sort-value="0.94" | 940 m || 
|-id=050 bgcolor=#fefefe
| 383050 ||  || — || August 27, 2005 || Anderson Mesa || LONEOS || NYS || align=right data-sort-value="0.76" | 760 m || 
|-id=051 bgcolor=#fefefe
| 383051 ||  || — || August 28, 2005 || Siding Spring || SSS || ERI || align=right | 3.1 km || 
|-id=052 bgcolor=#fefefe
| 383052 ||  || — || August 24, 2005 || Palomar || NEAT || MAS || align=right data-sort-value="0.83" | 830 m || 
|-id=053 bgcolor=#fefefe
| 383053 ||  || — || August 27, 2005 || Palomar || NEAT || — || align=right | 1.1 km || 
|-id=054 bgcolor=#fefefe
| 383054 ||  || — || August 27, 2005 || Palomar || NEAT || MAS || align=right data-sort-value="0.82" | 820 m || 
|-id=055 bgcolor=#d6d6d6
| 383055 ||  || — || August 28, 2005 || Kitt Peak || Spacewatch || — || align=right | 3.7 km || 
|-id=056 bgcolor=#fefefe
| 383056 ||  || — || August 28, 2005 || Kitt Peak || Spacewatch || V || align=right data-sort-value="0.79" | 790 m || 
|-id=057 bgcolor=#fefefe
| 383057 ||  || — || August 28, 2005 || Kitt Peak || Spacewatch || NYS || align=right data-sort-value="0.68" | 680 m || 
|-id=058 bgcolor=#fefefe
| 383058 ||  || — || August 28, 2005 || Kitt Peak || Spacewatch || — || align=right data-sort-value="0.90" | 900 m || 
|-id=059 bgcolor=#fefefe
| 383059 ||  || — || August 27, 2005 || Palomar || NEAT || — || align=right | 1.1 km || 
|-id=060 bgcolor=#fefefe
| 383060 ||  || — || August 28, 2005 || Siding Spring || SSS || NYS || align=right data-sort-value="0.82" | 820 m || 
|-id=061 bgcolor=#fefefe
| 383061 ||  || — || August 26, 2005 || Palomar || NEAT || — || align=right | 1.0 km || 
|-id=062 bgcolor=#fefefe
| 383062 ||  || — || August 28, 2005 || Kitt Peak || Spacewatch || NYS || align=right data-sort-value="0.71" | 710 m || 
|-id=063 bgcolor=#fefefe
| 383063 ||  || — || August 29, 2005 || Palomar || NEAT || ERI || align=right | 2.4 km || 
|-id=064 bgcolor=#fefefe
| 383064 ||  || — || August 25, 2005 || Palomar || NEAT || — || align=right data-sort-value="0.87" | 870 m || 
|-id=065 bgcolor=#fefefe
| 383065 ||  || — || August 30, 2005 || Kitt Peak || Spacewatch || — || align=right data-sort-value="0.94" | 940 m || 
|-id=066 bgcolor=#fefefe
| 383066 ||  || — || August 31, 2005 || Kitt Peak || Spacewatch || NYS || align=right data-sort-value="0.71" | 710 m || 
|-id=067 bgcolor=#fefefe
| 383067 Stoofke ||  ||  || September 7, 2005 || Uccle || T. Pauwels || — || align=right | 1.1 km || 
|-id=068 bgcolor=#fefefe
| 383068 ||  || — || September 10, 2005 || Goodricke-Pigott || R. A. Tucker || — || align=right | 1.4 km || 
|-id=069 bgcolor=#fefefe
| 383069 ||  || — || September 8, 2005 || Socorro || LINEAR || V || align=right data-sort-value="0.69" | 690 m || 
|-id=070 bgcolor=#fefefe
| 383070 ||  || — || September 9, 2005 || Socorro || LINEAR || — || align=right data-sort-value="0.91" | 910 m || 
|-id=071 bgcolor=#fefefe
| 383071 ||  || — || September 11, 2005 || Socorro || LINEAR || — || align=right | 1.1 km || 
|-id=072 bgcolor=#fefefe
| 383072 ||  || — || September 13, 2005 || Kitt Peak || Spacewatch || — || align=right data-sort-value="0.77" | 770 m || 
|-id=073 bgcolor=#fefefe
| 383073 ||  || — || September 3, 2005 || Palomar || NEAT || — || align=right | 1.1 km || 
|-id=074 bgcolor=#fefefe
| 383074 ||  || — || September 23, 2005 || Catalina || CSS || ERI || align=right | 2.2 km || 
|-id=075 bgcolor=#fefefe
| 383075 ||  || — || September 23, 2005 || Catalina || CSS || NYS || align=right data-sort-value="0.72" | 720 m || 
|-id=076 bgcolor=#fefefe
| 383076 ||  || — || September 23, 2005 || Kitt Peak || Spacewatch || V || align=right data-sort-value="0.75" | 750 m || 
|-id=077 bgcolor=#fefefe
| 383077 ||  || — || September 24, 2005 || Kitt Peak || Spacewatch || NYS || align=right data-sort-value="0.74" | 740 m || 
|-id=078 bgcolor=#fefefe
| 383078 ||  || — || September 24, 2005 || Kitt Peak || Spacewatch || — || align=right data-sort-value="0.90" | 900 m || 
|-id=079 bgcolor=#fefefe
| 383079 ||  || — || September 25, 2005 || Kitt Peak || Spacewatch || — || align=right | 1.0 km || 
|-id=080 bgcolor=#fefefe
| 383080 ||  || — || September 26, 2005 || Palomar || NEAT || — || align=right | 2.3 km || 
|-id=081 bgcolor=#fefefe
| 383081 ||  || — || September 27, 2005 || Kitt Peak || Spacewatch || — || align=right data-sort-value="0.93" | 930 m || 
|-id=082 bgcolor=#fefefe
| 383082 ||  || — || September 23, 2005 || Catalina || CSS || — || align=right data-sort-value="0.97" | 970 m || 
|-id=083 bgcolor=#fefefe
| 383083 ||  || — || September 24, 2005 || Kitt Peak || Spacewatch || MAS || align=right data-sort-value="0.67" | 670 m || 
|-id=084 bgcolor=#fefefe
| 383084 ||  || — || September 24, 2005 || Kitt Peak || Spacewatch || MAS || align=right data-sort-value="0.71" | 710 m || 
|-id=085 bgcolor=#fefefe
| 383085 ||  || — || September 24, 2005 || Kitt Peak || Spacewatch || MAS || align=right data-sort-value="0.73" | 730 m || 
|-id=086 bgcolor=#fefefe
| 383086 ||  || — || September 24, 2005 || Kitt Peak || Spacewatch || NYS || align=right data-sort-value="0.75" | 750 m || 
|-id=087 bgcolor=#fefefe
| 383087 ||  || — || September 24, 2005 || Kitt Peak || Spacewatch || CLA || align=right | 1.6 km || 
|-id=088 bgcolor=#fefefe
| 383088 ||  || — || September 24, 2005 || Kitt Peak || Spacewatch || FLO || align=right data-sort-value="0.74" | 740 m || 
|-id=089 bgcolor=#fefefe
| 383089 ||  || — || September 24, 2005 || Kitt Peak || Spacewatch || NYS || align=right data-sort-value="0.84" | 840 m || 
|-id=090 bgcolor=#fefefe
| 383090 ||  || — || September 24, 2005 || Kitt Peak || Spacewatch || NYS || align=right data-sort-value="0.65" | 650 m || 
|-id=091 bgcolor=#fefefe
| 383091 ||  || — || September 24, 2005 || Kitt Peak || Spacewatch || V || align=right data-sort-value="0.72" | 720 m || 
|-id=092 bgcolor=#fefefe
| 383092 ||  || — || September 25, 2005 || Kitt Peak || Spacewatch || — || align=right data-sort-value="0.90" | 900 m || 
|-id=093 bgcolor=#fefefe
| 383093 ||  || — || September 25, 2005 || Kitt Peak || Spacewatch || — || align=right | 1.0 km || 
|-id=094 bgcolor=#fefefe
| 383094 ||  || — || September 26, 2005 || Catalina || CSS || — || align=right | 2.2 km || 
|-id=095 bgcolor=#fefefe
| 383095 ||  || — || September 26, 2005 || Kitt Peak || Spacewatch || — || align=right | 1.0 km || 
|-id=096 bgcolor=#fefefe
| 383096 ||  || — || September 28, 2005 || Palomar || NEAT || — || align=right | 1.0 km || 
|-id=097 bgcolor=#fefefe
| 383097 ||  || — || September 24, 2005 || Kitt Peak || Spacewatch || — || align=right | 1.5 km || 
|-id=098 bgcolor=#fefefe
| 383098 ||  || — || September 25, 2005 || Palomar || NEAT || — || align=right | 1.7 km || 
|-id=099 bgcolor=#fefefe
| 383099 ||  || — || September 25, 2005 || Kitt Peak || Spacewatch || MAS || align=right data-sort-value="0.74" | 740 m || 
|-id=100 bgcolor=#fefefe
| 383100 ||  || — || September 25, 2005 || Kitt Peak || Spacewatch || V || align=right data-sort-value="0.62" | 620 m || 
|}

383101–383200 

|-bgcolor=#fefefe
| 383101 ||  || — || September 26, 2005 || Kitt Peak || Spacewatch || — || align=right data-sort-value="0.84" | 840 m || 
|-id=102 bgcolor=#fefefe
| 383102 ||  || — || September 28, 2005 || Palomar || NEAT || MAS || align=right data-sort-value="0.80" | 800 m || 
|-id=103 bgcolor=#fefefe
| 383103 ||  || — || September 29, 2005 || Anderson Mesa || LONEOS || — || align=right | 1.2 km || 
|-id=104 bgcolor=#fefefe
| 383104 ||  || — || September 29, 2005 || Kitt Peak || Spacewatch || — || align=right | 1.1 km || 
|-id=105 bgcolor=#fefefe
| 383105 ||  || — || September 29, 2005 || Mount Lemmon || Mount Lemmon Survey || MAS || align=right data-sort-value="0.62" | 620 m || 
|-id=106 bgcolor=#fefefe
| 383106 ||  || — || September 29, 2005 || Anderson Mesa || LONEOS || EUT || align=right data-sort-value="0.80" | 800 m || 
|-id=107 bgcolor=#fefefe
| 383107 ||  || — || September 29, 2005 || Mount Lemmon || Mount Lemmon Survey || NYS || align=right data-sort-value="0.81" | 810 m || 
|-id=108 bgcolor=#fefefe
| 383108 ||  || — || September 30, 2005 || Kitt Peak || Spacewatch || — || align=right data-sort-value="0.92" | 920 m || 
|-id=109 bgcolor=#fefefe
| 383109 ||  || — || September 30, 2005 || Anderson Mesa || LONEOS || NYS || align=right data-sort-value="0.68" | 680 m || 
|-id=110 bgcolor=#fefefe
| 383110 ||  || — || September 30, 2005 || Mount Lemmon || Mount Lemmon Survey || MAS || align=right data-sort-value="0.81" | 810 m || 
|-id=111 bgcolor=#fefefe
| 383111 ||  || — || September 29, 2005 || Kitt Peak || Spacewatch || MAS || align=right data-sort-value="0.90" | 900 m || 
|-id=112 bgcolor=#fefefe
| 383112 ||  || — || September 30, 2005 || Mount Lemmon || Mount Lemmon Survey || — || align=right data-sort-value="0.61" | 610 m || 
|-id=113 bgcolor=#fefefe
| 383113 ||  || — || September 30, 2005 || Kitt Peak || Spacewatch || V || align=right data-sort-value="0.80" | 800 m || 
|-id=114 bgcolor=#fefefe
| 383114 ||  || — || September 24, 2005 || Palomar || NEAT || — || align=right | 1.2 km || 
|-id=115 bgcolor=#fefefe
| 383115 ||  || — || September 22, 2005 || Palomar || NEAT || — || align=right | 1.0 km || 
|-id=116 bgcolor=#fefefe
| 383116 ||  || — || September 23, 2005 || Anderson Mesa || LONEOS || — || align=right | 1.1 km || 
|-id=117 bgcolor=#fefefe
| 383117 ||  || — || September 22, 2005 || Palomar || NEAT || — || align=right data-sort-value="0.96" | 960 m || 
|-id=118 bgcolor=#fefefe
| 383118 ||  || — || September 29, 2005 || Mount Lemmon || Mount Lemmon Survey || EUT || align=right data-sort-value="0.57" | 570 m || 
|-id=119 bgcolor=#fefefe
| 383119 ||  || — || September 23, 2005 || Kitt Peak || Spacewatch || NYS || align=right data-sort-value="0.70" | 700 m || 
|-id=120 bgcolor=#fefefe
| 383120 ||  || — || September 29, 2005 || Kitt Peak || Spacewatch || — || align=right data-sort-value="0.67" | 670 m || 
|-id=121 bgcolor=#fefefe
| 383121 ||  || — || October 1, 2005 || Mount Lemmon || Mount Lemmon Survey || — || align=right | 1.7 km || 
|-id=122 bgcolor=#fefefe
| 383122 ||  || — || October 1, 2005 || Catalina || CSS || NYS || align=right data-sort-value="0.74" | 740 m || 
|-id=123 bgcolor=#fefefe
| 383123 ||  || — || September 10, 2005 || Anderson Mesa || LONEOS || V || align=right data-sort-value="0.83" | 830 m || 
|-id=124 bgcolor=#fefefe
| 383124 ||  || — || October 5, 2005 || Mount Lemmon || Mount Lemmon Survey || NYS || align=right data-sort-value="0.75" | 750 m || 
|-id=125 bgcolor=#fefefe
| 383125 ||  || — || October 6, 2005 || Mount Lemmon || Mount Lemmon Survey || MAS || align=right data-sort-value="0.72" | 720 m || 
|-id=126 bgcolor=#fefefe
| 383126 ||  || — || October 1, 2005 || Catalina || CSS || V || align=right data-sort-value="0.94" | 940 m || 
|-id=127 bgcolor=#fefefe
| 383127 ||  || — || October 7, 2005 || Kitt Peak || Spacewatch || — || align=right data-sort-value="0.75" | 750 m || 
|-id=128 bgcolor=#fefefe
| 383128 ||  || — || October 7, 2005 || Kitt Peak || Spacewatch || — || align=right | 1.0 km || 
|-id=129 bgcolor=#fefefe
| 383129 ||  || — || October 9, 2005 || Kitt Peak || Spacewatch || — || align=right data-sort-value="0.98" | 980 m || 
|-id=130 bgcolor=#fefefe
| 383130 ||  || — || October 5, 2005 || Mount Lemmon || Mount Lemmon Survey || CLA || align=right | 1.4 km || 
|-id=131 bgcolor=#fefefe
| 383131 || 2005 UX || — || October 20, 2005 || Junk Bond || D. Healy || NYS || align=right data-sort-value="0.74" | 740 m || 
|-id=132 bgcolor=#fefefe
| 383132 ||  || — || October 21, 2005 || Palomar || NEAT || — || align=right | 1.2 km || 
|-id=133 bgcolor=#fefefe
| 383133 ||  || — || October 23, 2005 || Catalina || CSS || MAS || align=right data-sort-value="0.87" | 870 m || 
|-id=134 bgcolor=#fefefe
| 383134 ||  || — || October 24, 2005 || Kitt Peak || Spacewatch || — || align=right data-sort-value="0.82" | 820 m || 
|-id=135 bgcolor=#fefefe
| 383135 ||  || — || October 22, 2005 || Kitt Peak || Spacewatch || — || align=right data-sort-value="0.80" | 800 m || 
|-id=136 bgcolor=#fefefe
| 383136 ||  || — || October 23, 2005 || Catalina || CSS || — || align=right | 1.1 km || 
|-id=137 bgcolor=#E9E9E9
| 383137 ||  || — || October 23, 2005 || Catalina || CSS || — || align=right data-sort-value="0.79" | 790 m || 
|-id=138 bgcolor=#fefefe
| 383138 ||  || — || October 22, 2005 || Kitt Peak || Spacewatch || CIM || align=right | 2.8 km || 
|-id=139 bgcolor=#fefefe
| 383139 ||  || — || October 22, 2005 || Kitt Peak || Spacewatch || MAS || align=right data-sort-value="0.88" | 880 m || 
|-id=140 bgcolor=#fefefe
| 383140 ||  || — || October 22, 2005 || Kitt Peak || Spacewatch || MAS || align=right data-sort-value="0.82" | 820 m || 
|-id=141 bgcolor=#fefefe
| 383141 ||  || — || October 22, 2005 || Kitt Peak || Spacewatch || NYS || align=right data-sort-value="0.72" | 720 m || 
|-id=142 bgcolor=#fefefe
| 383142 ||  || — || October 27, 2005 || Socorro || LINEAR || — || align=right data-sort-value="0.98" | 980 m || 
|-id=143 bgcolor=#fefefe
| 383143 ||  || — || October 24, 2005 || Kitt Peak || Spacewatch || V || align=right data-sort-value="0.72" | 720 m || 
|-id=144 bgcolor=#fefefe
| 383144 ||  || — || October 26, 2005 || Kitt Peak || Spacewatch || MAS || align=right data-sort-value="0.75" | 750 m || 
|-id=145 bgcolor=#E9E9E9
| 383145 ||  || — || October 24, 2005 || Kitt Peak || Spacewatch || — || align=right | 1.6 km || 
|-id=146 bgcolor=#fefefe
| 383146 ||  || — || October 25, 2005 || Kitt Peak || Spacewatch || — || align=right data-sort-value="0.89" | 890 m || 
|-id=147 bgcolor=#fefefe
| 383147 ||  || — || October 25, 2005 || Kitt Peak || Spacewatch || — || align=right data-sort-value="0.91" | 910 m || 
|-id=148 bgcolor=#fefefe
| 383148 ||  || — || October 27, 2005 || Kitt Peak || Spacewatch || NYS || align=right data-sort-value="0.68" | 680 m || 
|-id=149 bgcolor=#fefefe
| 383149 ||  || — || October 27, 2005 || Kitt Peak || Spacewatch || MAS || align=right data-sort-value="0.77" | 770 m || 
|-id=150 bgcolor=#fefefe
| 383150 ||  || — || October 26, 2005 || Kitt Peak || Spacewatch || — || align=right data-sort-value="0.87" | 870 m || 
|-id=151 bgcolor=#fefefe
| 383151 ||  || — || October 29, 2005 || Mount Lemmon || Mount Lemmon Survey || MAS || align=right data-sort-value="0.84" | 840 m || 
|-id=152 bgcolor=#fefefe
| 383152 ||  || — || October 25, 2005 || Mount Lemmon || Mount Lemmon Survey || — || align=right | 1.2 km || 
|-id=153 bgcolor=#fefefe
| 383153 ||  || — || October 27, 2005 || Kitt Peak || Spacewatch || NYS || align=right data-sort-value="0.69" | 690 m || 
|-id=154 bgcolor=#fefefe
| 383154 ||  || — || October 28, 2005 || Catalina || CSS || NYS || align=right data-sort-value="0.70" | 700 m || 
|-id=155 bgcolor=#fefefe
| 383155 ||  || — || October 29, 2005 || Mount Lemmon || Mount Lemmon Survey || NYS || align=right data-sort-value="0.75" | 750 m || 
|-id=156 bgcolor=#fefefe
| 383156 ||  || — || October 31, 2005 || Palomar || NEAT || — || align=right | 1.1 km || 
|-id=157 bgcolor=#fefefe
| 383157 ||  || — || October 22, 2005 || Kitt Peak || Spacewatch || NYS || align=right data-sort-value="0.68" | 680 m || 
|-id=158 bgcolor=#fefefe
| 383158 ||  || — || October 27, 2005 || Kitt Peak || Spacewatch || NYS || align=right data-sort-value="0.79" | 790 m || 
|-id=159 bgcolor=#fefefe
| 383159 ||  || — || October 29, 2005 || Mount Lemmon || Mount Lemmon Survey || — || align=right | 2.4 km || 
|-id=160 bgcolor=#fefefe
| 383160 ||  || — || October 30, 2005 || Kitt Peak || Spacewatch || — || align=right data-sort-value="0.82" | 820 m || 
|-id=161 bgcolor=#fefefe
| 383161 ||  || — || October 29, 2005 || Catalina || CSS || — || align=right data-sort-value="0.88" | 880 m || 
|-id=162 bgcolor=#fefefe
| 383162 ||  || — || October 30, 2005 || Mount Lemmon || Mount Lemmon Survey || — || align=right | 1.1 km || 
|-id=163 bgcolor=#fefefe
| 383163 ||  || — || October 26, 2005 || Kitt Peak || Spacewatch || — || align=right data-sort-value="0.86" | 860 m || 
|-id=164 bgcolor=#fefefe
| 383164 ||  || — || October 23, 2005 || Palomar || NEAT || — || align=right data-sort-value="0.78" | 780 m || 
|-id=165 bgcolor=#FA8072
| 383165 ||  || — || November 7, 2005 || Mauna Kea || D. J. Tholen || — || align=right data-sort-value="0.67" | 670 m || 
|-id=166 bgcolor=#fefefe
| 383166 ||  || — || November 12, 2005 || Socorro || LINEAR || H || align=right data-sort-value="0.96" | 960 m || 
|-id=167 bgcolor=#E9E9E9
| 383167 ||  || — || November 1, 2005 || Kitt Peak || Spacewatch || — || align=right data-sort-value="0.77" | 770 m || 
|-id=168 bgcolor=#fefefe
| 383168 ||  || — || November 1, 2005 || Mount Lemmon || Mount Lemmon Survey || — || align=right | 1.4 km || 
|-id=169 bgcolor=#E9E9E9
| 383169 ||  || — || November 1, 2005 || Mount Lemmon || Mount Lemmon Survey || — || align=right | 1.1 km || 
|-id=170 bgcolor=#fefefe
| 383170 ||  || — || November 5, 2005 || Kitt Peak || Spacewatch || NYS || align=right data-sort-value="0.60" | 600 m || 
|-id=171 bgcolor=#fefefe
| 383171 ||  || — || November 10, 2005 || Catalina || CSS || H || align=right data-sort-value="0.62" | 620 m || 
|-id=172 bgcolor=#E9E9E9
| 383172 ||  || — || November 6, 2005 || Kitt Peak || Spacewatch || — || align=right data-sort-value="0.79" | 790 m || 
|-id=173 bgcolor=#fefefe
| 383173 ||  || — || November 10, 2005 || Catalina || CSS || PHO || align=right | 1.4 km || 
|-id=174 bgcolor=#fefefe
| 383174 ||  || — || November 2, 2005 || Socorro || LINEAR || — || align=right data-sort-value="0.95" | 950 m || 
|-id=175 bgcolor=#fefefe
| 383175 ||  || — || November 1, 2005 || Apache Point || A. C. Becker || NYS || align=right data-sort-value="0.55" | 550 m || 
|-id=176 bgcolor=#E9E9E9
| 383176 ||  || — || November 21, 2005 || Kitt Peak || Spacewatch || — || align=right | 1.1 km || 
|-id=177 bgcolor=#E9E9E9
| 383177 ||  || — || November 21, 2005 || Kitt Peak || Spacewatch || — || align=right | 2.4 km || 
|-id=178 bgcolor=#fefefe
| 383178 ||  || — || November 25, 2005 || Catalina || CSS || H || align=right data-sort-value="0.70" | 700 m || 
|-id=179 bgcolor=#d6d6d6
| 383179 ||  || — || November 25, 2005 || Kitt Peak || Spacewatch || 3:2 || align=right | 3.4 km || 
|-id=180 bgcolor=#fefefe
| 383180 ||  || — || November 28, 2005 || Catalina || CSS || MAS || align=right data-sort-value="0.86" | 860 m || 
|-id=181 bgcolor=#fefefe
| 383181 ||  || — || November 28, 2005 || Kitt Peak || Spacewatch || — || align=right | 1.0 km || 
|-id=182 bgcolor=#E9E9E9
| 383182 ||  || — || November 30, 2005 || Catalina || CSS || — || align=right | 1.9 km || 
|-id=183 bgcolor=#E9E9E9
| 383183 ||  || — || November 30, 2005 || Kitt Peak || Spacewatch || — || align=right data-sort-value="0.78" | 780 m || 
|-id=184 bgcolor=#fefefe
| 383184 ||  || — || November 28, 2005 || Palomar || NEAT || H || align=right data-sort-value="0.65" | 650 m || 
|-id=185 bgcolor=#fefefe
| 383185 ||  || — || November 30, 2005 || Socorro || LINEAR || NYS || align=right data-sort-value="0.76" | 760 m || 
|-id=186 bgcolor=#fefefe
| 383186 ||  || — || November 28, 2005 || Palomar || NEAT || H || align=right data-sort-value="0.86" | 860 m || 
|-id=187 bgcolor=#fefefe
| 383187 ||  || — || December 1, 2005 || Kitt Peak || Spacewatch || V || align=right data-sort-value="0.81" | 810 m || 
|-id=188 bgcolor=#E9E9E9
| 383188 ||  || — || November 6, 2005 || Mount Lemmon || Mount Lemmon Survey || — || align=right | 1.1 km || 
|-id=189 bgcolor=#fefefe
| 383189 ||  || — || November 1, 2005 || Mount Lemmon || Mount Lemmon Survey || — || align=right | 1.2 km || 
|-id=190 bgcolor=#fefefe
| 383190 ||  || — || December 8, 2005 || Socorro || LINEAR || H || align=right data-sort-value="0.68" | 680 m || 
|-id=191 bgcolor=#E9E9E9
| 383191 ||  || — || December 1, 2005 || Kitt Peak || M. W. Buie || HEN || align=right | 1.2 km || 
|-id=192 bgcolor=#fefefe
| 383192 ||  || — || December 7, 2005 || Catalina || CSS || H || align=right data-sort-value="0.71" | 710 m || 
|-id=193 bgcolor=#E9E9E9
| 383193 ||  || — || December 22, 2005 || Kitt Peak || Spacewatch || — || align=right | 1.3 km || 
|-id=194 bgcolor=#fefefe
| 383194 ||  || — || December 24, 2005 || Kitt Peak || Spacewatch || — || align=right data-sort-value="0.81" | 810 m || 
|-id=195 bgcolor=#E9E9E9
| 383195 ||  || — || December 22, 2005 || Kitt Peak || Spacewatch || — || align=right | 1.0 km || 
|-id=196 bgcolor=#E9E9E9
| 383196 ||  || — || December 24, 2005 || Kitt Peak || Spacewatch || — || align=right | 1.6 km || 
|-id=197 bgcolor=#E9E9E9
| 383197 ||  || — || December 24, 2005 || Kitt Peak || Spacewatch || — || align=right | 1.0 km || 
|-id=198 bgcolor=#E9E9E9
| 383198 ||  || — || December 25, 2005 || Kitt Peak || Spacewatch || — || align=right | 1.0 km || 
|-id=199 bgcolor=#E9E9E9
| 383199 ||  || — || December 22, 2005 || Kitt Peak || Spacewatch || — || align=right | 1.0 km || 
|-id=200 bgcolor=#E9E9E9
| 383200 ||  || — || December 22, 2005 || Kitt Peak || Spacewatch || — || align=right data-sort-value="0.66" | 660 m || 
|}

383201–383300 

|-bgcolor=#E9E9E9
| 383201 ||  || — || December 24, 2005 || Catalina || CSS || BAR || align=right | 1.4 km || 
|-id=202 bgcolor=#E9E9E9
| 383202 ||  || — || December 25, 2005 || Kitt Peak || Spacewatch || — || align=right | 2.0 km || 
|-id=203 bgcolor=#fefefe
| 383203 ||  || — || December 26, 2005 || Kitt Peak || Spacewatch || H || align=right | 1.1 km || 
|-id=204 bgcolor=#fefefe
| 383204 ||  || — || December 8, 2005 || Kitt Peak || Spacewatch || 417 || align=right data-sort-value="0.79" | 790 m || 
|-id=205 bgcolor=#d6d6d6
| 383205 ||  || — || November 10, 2005 || Mount Lemmon || Mount Lemmon Survey || 3:2 || align=right | 3.6 km || 
|-id=206 bgcolor=#E9E9E9
| 383206 ||  || — || December 25, 2005 || Mount Lemmon || Mount Lemmon Survey || — || align=right | 1.1 km || 
|-id=207 bgcolor=#E9E9E9
| 383207 ||  || — || December 26, 2005 || Mount Lemmon || Mount Lemmon Survey || — || align=right | 2.7 km || 
|-id=208 bgcolor=#E9E9E9
| 383208 ||  || — || December 28, 2005 || Kitt Peak || Spacewatch || — || align=right data-sort-value="0.93" | 930 m || 
|-id=209 bgcolor=#E9E9E9
| 383209 ||  || — || December 25, 2005 || Kitt Peak || Spacewatch || — || align=right | 2.1 km || 
|-id=210 bgcolor=#fefefe
| 383210 ||  || — || December 25, 2005 || Kitt Peak || Spacewatch || — || align=right | 1.1 km || 
|-id=211 bgcolor=#E9E9E9
| 383211 ||  || — || December 27, 2005 || Mount Lemmon || Mount Lemmon Survey || — || align=right | 1.1 km || 
|-id=212 bgcolor=#E9E9E9
| 383212 ||  || — || December 28, 2005 || Mount Lemmon || Mount Lemmon Survey || — || align=right data-sort-value="0.69" | 690 m || 
|-id=213 bgcolor=#E9E9E9
| 383213 ||  || — || December 28, 2005 || Mount Lemmon || Mount Lemmon Survey || — || align=right | 1.9 km || 
|-id=214 bgcolor=#E9E9E9
| 383214 ||  || — || December 25, 2005 || Kitt Peak || Spacewatch || — || align=right | 1.1 km || 
|-id=215 bgcolor=#E9E9E9
| 383215 ||  || — || December 28, 2005 || Catalina || CSS || — || align=right | 1.7 km || 
|-id=216 bgcolor=#E9E9E9
| 383216 ||  || — || December 26, 2005 || Mount Lemmon || Mount Lemmon Survey || EUN || align=right | 1.3 km || 
|-id=217 bgcolor=#fefefe
| 383217 ||  || — || December 27, 2005 || Kitt Peak || Spacewatch || H || align=right data-sort-value="0.65" | 650 m || 
|-id=218 bgcolor=#FA8072
| 383218 ||  || — || December 30, 2005 || Socorro || LINEAR || — || align=right | 3.0 km || 
|-id=219 bgcolor=#fefefe
| 383219 ||  || — || December 29, 2005 || Mount Lemmon || Mount Lemmon Survey || MAS || align=right data-sort-value="0.96" | 960 m || 
|-id=220 bgcolor=#E9E9E9
| 383220 ||  || — || December 30, 2005 || Kitt Peak || Spacewatch || — || align=right | 2.3 km || 
|-id=221 bgcolor=#E9E9E9
| 383221 ||  || — || January 2, 2006 || Catalina || CSS || — || align=right | 2.7 km || 
|-id=222 bgcolor=#E9E9E9
| 383222 ||  || — || January 5, 2006 || Kitt Peak || Spacewatch || — || align=right | 3.1 km || 
|-id=223 bgcolor=#E9E9E9
| 383223 ||  || — || January 6, 2006 || Mount Lemmon || Mount Lemmon Survey || — || align=right | 1.2 km || 
|-id=224 bgcolor=#E9E9E9
| 383224 ||  || — || January 7, 2006 || Anderson Mesa || LONEOS || — || align=right | 1.8 km || 
|-id=225 bgcolor=#fefefe
| 383225 ||  || — || January 4, 2006 || Catalina || CSS || H || align=right data-sort-value="0.67" | 670 m || 
|-id=226 bgcolor=#E9E9E9
| 383226 ||  || — || January 6, 2006 || Catalina || CSS || — || align=right | 1.5 km || 
|-id=227 bgcolor=#E9E9E9
| 383227 ||  || — || January 7, 2006 || Catalina || CSS || — || align=right | 1.4 km || 
|-id=228 bgcolor=#E9E9E9
| 383228 ||  || — || January 5, 2006 || Mount Lemmon || Mount Lemmon Survey || — || align=right | 1.00 km || 
|-id=229 bgcolor=#E9E9E9
| 383229 ||  || — || January 21, 2006 || Kitt Peak || Spacewatch || — || align=right | 1.1 km || 
|-id=230 bgcolor=#E9E9E9
| 383230 ||  || — || January 23, 2006 || Kitt Peak || Spacewatch || — || align=right | 2.4 km || 
|-id=231 bgcolor=#E9E9E9
| 383231 ||  || — || January 22, 2006 || Anderson Mesa || LONEOS || — || align=right | 1.5 km || 
|-id=232 bgcolor=#E9E9E9
| 383232 ||  || — || January 23, 2006 || Kitt Peak || Spacewatch || — || align=right | 1.1 km || 
|-id=233 bgcolor=#E9E9E9
| 383233 ||  || — || January 23, 2006 || Mount Lemmon || Mount Lemmon Survey || — || align=right data-sort-value="0.72" | 720 m || 
|-id=234 bgcolor=#E9E9E9
| 383234 ||  || — || January 19, 2006 || Catalina || CSS || HNS || align=right | 1.7 km || 
|-id=235 bgcolor=#E9E9E9
| 383235 ||  || — || January 20, 2006 || Kitt Peak || Spacewatch || — || align=right | 1.4 km || 
|-id=236 bgcolor=#E9E9E9
| 383236 ||  || — || January 22, 2006 || Mount Lemmon || Mount Lemmon Survey || — || align=right | 1.5 km || 
|-id=237 bgcolor=#E9E9E9
| 383237 ||  || — || January 23, 2006 || Kitt Peak || Spacewatch || — || align=right | 1.2 km || 
|-id=238 bgcolor=#E9E9E9
| 383238 ||  || — || January 25, 2006 || Kitt Peak || Spacewatch || — || align=right data-sort-value="0.88" | 880 m || 
|-id=239 bgcolor=#E9E9E9
| 383239 ||  || — || January 26, 2006 || Kitt Peak || Spacewatch || — || align=right | 1.6 km || 
|-id=240 bgcolor=#E9E9E9
| 383240 ||  || — || January 26, 2006 || Mount Lemmon || Mount Lemmon Survey || — || align=right | 1.0 km || 
|-id=241 bgcolor=#E9E9E9
| 383241 ||  || — || January 27, 2006 || Mount Lemmon || Mount Lemmon Survey || — || align=right data-sort-value="0.75" | 750 m || 
|-id=242 bgcolor=#E9E9E9
| 383242 ||  || — || January 22, 2006 || Anderson Mesa || LONEOS || — || align=right data-sort-value="0.97" | 970 m || 
|-id=243 bgcolor=#E9E9E9
| 383243 ||  || — || January 25, 2006 || Kitt Peak || Spacewatch || — || align=right | 1.9 km || 
|-id=244 bgcolor=#E9E9E9
| 383244 ||  || — || January 26, 2006 || Catalina || CSS || — || align=right | 1.6 km || 
|-id=245 bgcolor=#E9E9E9
| 383245 ||  || — || January 28, 2006 || Anderson Mesa || LONEOS || — || align=right data-sort-value="0.94" | 940 m || 
|-id=246 bgcolor=#E9E9E9
| 383246 ||  || — || January 31, 2006 || Kitt Peak || Spacewatch || — || align=right | 1.9 km || 
|-id=247 bgcolor=#E9E9E9
| 383247 ||  || — || January 31, 2006 || Kitt Peak || Spacewatch || — || align=right data-sort-value="0.98" | 980 m || 
|-id=248 bgcolor=#E9E9E9
| 383248 ||  || — || January 31, 2006 || Kitt Peak || Spacewatch || KON || align=right | 2.4 km || 
|-id=249 bgcolor=#E9E9E9
| 383249 ||  || — || January 28, 2006 || Mount Lemmon || Mount Lemmon Survey || — || align=right | 1.3 km || 
|-id=250 bgcolor=#E9E9E9
| 383250 ||  || — || January 26, 2006 || Catalina || CSS || — || align=right | 3.2 km || 
|-id=251 bgcolor=#E9E9E9
| 383251 ||  || — || January 26, 2006 || Kitt Peak || Spacewatch || — || align=right | 2.2 km || 
|-id=252 bgcolor=#E9E9E9
| 383252 ||  || — || January 23, 2006 || Mount Lemmon || Mount Lemmon Survey || HNS || align=right | 1.1 km || 
|-id=253 bgcolor=#E9E9E9
| 383253 ||  || — || February 1, 2006 || Mount Lemmon || Mount Lemmon Survey || JUN || align=right | 1.1 km || 
|-id=254 bgcolor=#E9E9E9
| 383254 ||  || — || February 3, 2006 || 7300 Observatory || W. K. Y. Yeung || — || align=right | 1.8 km || 
|-id=255 bgcolor=#E9E9E9
| 383255 ||  || — || February 2, 2006 || Kitt Peak || Spacewatch || — || align=right data-sort-value="0.94" | 940 m || 
|-id=256 bgcolor=#E9E9E9
| 383256 ||  || — || February 2, 2006 || Mount Lemmon || Mount Lemmon Survey || — || align=right | 1.3 km || 
|-id=257 bgcolor=#E9E9E9
| 383257 ||  || — || February 2, 2006 || Kitt Peak || Spacewatch || — || align=right | 1.0 km || 
|-id=258 bgcolor=#fefefe
| 383258 ||  || — || February 7, 2006 || Mount Lemmon || Mount Lemmon Survey || H || align=right data-sort-value="0.64" | 640 m || 
|-id=259 bgcolor=#E9E9E9
| 383259 ||  || — || February 4, 2006 || Catalina || CSS || GER || align=right | 3.6 km || 
|-id=260 bgcolor=#E9E9E9
| 383260 ||  || — || February 6, 2006 || Kitt Peak || Spacewatch || — || align=right | 1.2 km || 
|-id=261 bgcolor=#E9E9E9
| 383261 ||  || — || February 20, 2006 || Kitt Peak || Spacewatch || — || align=right | 1.3 km || 
|-id=262 bgcolor=#E9E9E9
| 383262 ||  || — || February 20, 2006 || Catalina || CSS || — || align=right | 2.8 km || 
|-id=263 bgcolor=#E9E9E9
| 383263 ||  || — || February 24, 2006 || Mount Lemmon || Mount Lemmon Survey || ADE || align=right | 2.6 km || 
|-id=264 bgcolor=#E9E9E9
| 383264 ||  || — || February 24, 2006 || Mount Lemmon || Mount Lemmon Survey || — || align=right | 1.9 km || 
|-id=265 bgcolor=#E9E9E9
| 383265 ||  || — || February 24, 2006 || Mount Lemmon || Mount Lemmon Survey || — || align=right | 1.7 km || 
|-id=266 bgcolor=#E9E9E9
| 383266 ||  || — || February 21, 2006 || Catalina || CSS || — || align=right data-sort-value="0.85" | 850 m || 
|-id=267 bgcolor=#E9E9E9
| 383267 ||  || — || January 28, 2006 || Catalina || CSS || — || align=right | 2.8 km || 
|-id=268 bgcolor=#E9E9E9
| 383268 ||  || — || February 24, 2006 || Kitt Peak || Spacewatch || — || align=right data-sort-value="0.92" | 920 m || 
|-id=269 bgcolor=#E9E9E9
| 383269 ||  || — || February 24, 2006 || Kitt Peak || Spacewatch || — || align=right | 1.5 km || 
|-id=270 bgcolor=#E9E9E9
| 383270 ||  || — || February 24, 2006 || Kitt Peak || Spacewatch || — || align=right | 1.5 km || 
|-id=271 bgcolor=#E9E9E9
| 383271 ||  || — || February 24, 2006 || Kitt Peak || Spacewatch || — || align=right | 1.8 km || 
|-id=272 bgcolor=#E9E9E9
| 383272 ||  || — || February 25, 2006 || Kitt Peak || Spacewatch || — || align=right | 3.0 km || 
|-id=273 bgcolor=#E9E9E9
| 383273 ||  || — || February 27, 2006 || Socorro || LINEAR || — || align=right | 1.3 km || 
|-id=274 bgcolor=#E9E9E9
| 383274 ||  || — || February 23, 2006 || Anderson Mesa || LONEOS || — || align=right | 1.0 km || 
|-id=275 bgcolor=#E9E9E9
| 383275 ||  || — || February 25, 2006 || Kitt Peak || Spacewatch || — || align=right | 1.3 km || 
|-id=276 bgcolor=#E9E9E9
| 383276 ||  || — || February 25, 2006 || Kitt Peak || Spacewatch || — || align=right | 1.7 km || 
|-id=277 bgcolor=#E9E9E9
| 383277 ||  || — || February 25, 2006 || Mount Lemmon || Mount Lemmon Survey || — || align=right | 1.2 km || 
|-id=278 bgcolor=#E9E9E9
| 383278 ||  || — || September 21, 2003 || Kitt Peak || Spacewatch || — || align=right | 2.2 km || 
|-id=279 bgcolor=#E9E9E9
| 383279 ||  || — || February 25, 2006 || Kitt Peak || Spacewatch || — || align=right | 1.9 km || 
|-id=280 bgcolor=#E9E9E9
| 383280 ||  || — || February 25, 2006 || Mount Lemmon || Mount Lemmon Survey || — || align=right | 1.2 km || 
|-id=281 bgcolor=#E9E9E9
| 383281 ||  || — || February 27, 2006 || Kitt Peak || Spacewatch || — || align=right | 1.1 km || 
|-id=282 bgcolor=#E9E9E9
| 383282 ||  || — || December 9, 2004 || Kitt Peak || Spacewatch || AGN || align=right | 1.4 km || 
|-id=283 bgcolor=#E9E9E9
| 383283 ||  || — || February 27, 2006 || Mount Lemmon || Mount Lemmon Survey || — || align=right | 2.0 km || 
|-id=284 bgcolor=#E9E9E9
| 383284 ||  || — || February 27, 2006 || Kitt Peak || Spacewatch || — || align=right | 2.2 km || 
|-id=285 bgcolor=#E9E9E9
| 383285 ||  || — || February 21, 2006 || Catalina || CSS || — || align=right | 1.2 km || 
|-id=286 bgcolor=#E9E9E9
| 383286 ||  || — || February 25, 2006 || Catalina || CSS || EUN || align=right | 1.6 km || 
|-id=287 bgcolor=#E9E9E9
| 383287 ||  || — || February 28, 2006 || Catalina || CSS || — || align=right | 3.3 km || 
|-id=288 bgcolor=#E9E9E9
| 383288 ||  || — || February 27, 2006 || Catalina || CSS || EUN || align=right | 1.3 km || 
|-id=289 bgcolor=#E9E9E9
| 383289 ||  || — || February 25, 2006 || Mount Lemmon || Mount Lemmon Survey || — || align=right | 1.7 km || 
|-id=290 bgcolor=#E9E9E9
| 383290 ||  || — || February 24, 2006 || Kitt Peak || Spacewatch || — || align=right | 1.3 km || 
|-id=291 bgcolor=#E9E9E9
| 383291 ||  || — || March 2, 2006 || Kitt Peak || Spacewatch || — || align=right | 1.9 km || 
|-id=292 bgcolor=#E9E9E9
| 383292 ||  || — || March 3, 2006 || Kitt Peak || Spacewatch || — || align=right data-sort-value="0.72" | 720 m || 
|-id=293 bgcolor=#E9E9E9
| 383293 ||  || — || March 3, 2006 || Kitt Peak || Spacewatch || — || align=right | 1.8 km || 
|-id=294 bgcolor=#E9E9E9
| 383294 ||  || — || March 3, 2006 || Kitt Peak || Spacewatch || — || align=right data-sort-value="0.92" | 920 m || 
|-id=295 bgcolor=#E9E9E9
| 383295 ||  || — || March 3, 2006 || Kitt Peak || Spacewatch || — || align=right | 1.4 km || 
|-id=296 bgcolor=#E9E9E9
| 383296 ||  || — || March 4, 2006 || Kitt Peak || Spacewatch || — || align=right data-sort-value="0.91" | 910 m || 
|-id=297 bgcolor=#E9E9E9
| 383297 ||  || — || March 2, 2006 || Kitt Peak || Spacewatch || — || align=right | 1.7 km || 
|-id=298 bgcolor=#E9E9E9
| 383298 ||  || — || March 24, 2006 || Kitt Peak || Spacewatch || JUN || align=right | 1.1 km || 
|-id=299 bgcolor=#E9E9E9
| 383299 ||  || — || March 24, 2006 || Mount Lemmon || Mount Lemmon Survey || — || align=right | 2.1 km || 
|-id=300 bgcolor=#E9E9E9
| 383300 ||  || — || March 23, 2006 || Kitt Peak || Spacewatch || MIS || align=right | 2.7 km || 
|}

383301–383400 

|-bgcolor=#E9E9E9
| 383301 ||  || — || April 2, 2006 || Kitt Peak || Spacewatch || — || align=right | 2.9 km || 
|-id=302 bgcolor=#E9E9E9
| 383302 ||  || — || April 2, 2006 || Kitt Peak || Spacewatch || NEM || align=right | 2.8 km || 
|-id=303 bgcolor=#E9E9E9
| 383303 ||  || — || April 2, 2006 || Socorro || LINEAR || — || align=right | 1.6 km || 
|-id=304 bgcolor=#E9E9E9
| 383304 ||  || — || April 2, 2006 || Anderson Mesa || LONEOS || — || align=right | 2.8 km || 
|-id=305 bgcolor=#E9E9E9
| 383305 ||  || — || April 2, 2006 || Kitt Peak || Spacewatch || — || align=right | 1.8 km || 
|-id=306 bgcolor=#E9E9E9
| 383306 ||  || — || April 7, 2006 || Anderson Mesa || LONEOS || JUN || align=right | 1.5 km || 
|-id=307 bgcolor=#E9E9E9
| 383307 ||  || — || April 19, 2006 || Kitt Peak || Spacewatch || — || align=right | 2.5 km || 
|-id=308 bgcolor=#E9E9E9
| 383308 ||  || — || April 19, 2006 || Mount Lemmon || Mount Lemmon Survey || — || align=right | 2.9 km || 
|-id=309 bgcolor=#E9E9E9
| 383309 ||  || — || April 18, 2006 || Catalina || CSS || — || align=right | 2.3 km || 
|-id=310 bgcolor=#E9E9E9
| 383310 ||  || — || April 26, 2006 || Anderson Mesa || LONEOS || — || align=right | 1.8 km || 
|-id=311 bgcolor=#E9E9E9
| 383311 ||  || — || April 24, 2006 || Kitt Peak || Spacewatch || — || align=right | 1.9 km || 
|-id=312 bgcolor=#d6d6d6
| 383312 ||  || — || April 24, 2006 || Mount Lemmon || Mount Lemmon Survey || CHA || align=right | 2.4 km || 
|-id=313 bgcolor=#E9E9E9
| 383313 ||  || — || April 25, 2006 || Catalina || CSS || — || align=right | 3.1 km || 
|-id=314 bgcolor=#E9E9E9
| 383314 ||  || — || April 25, 2006 || Kitt Peak || Spacewatch || — || align=right | 1.8 km || 
|-id=315 bgcolor=#E9E9E9
| 383315 ||  || — || April 25, 2006 || Kitt Peak || Spacewatch || — || align=right | 2.2 km || 
|-id=316 bgcolor=#E9E9E9
| 383316 ||  || — || April 26, 2006 || Kitt Peak || Spacewatch || — || align=right | 2.3 km || 
|-id=317 bgcolor=#E9E9E9
| 383317 ||  || — || April 29, 2006 || Kitt Peak || Spacewatch || — || align=right | 1.9 km || 
|-id=318 bgcolor=#E9E9E9
| 383318 ||  || — || April 29, 2006 || Kitt Peak || Spacewatch || — || align=right | 2.2 km || 
|-id=319 bgcolor=#E9E9E9
| 383319 ||  || — || April 30, 2006 || Kitt Peak || Spacewatch || WIT || align=right | 1.1 km || 
|-id=320 bgcolor=#E9E9E9
| 383320 ||  || — || April 30, 2006 || Kitt Peak || Spacewatch || — || align=right | 2.1 km || 
|-id=321 bgcolor=#E9E9E9
| 383321 ||  || — || April 30, 2006 || Kitt Peak || Spacewatch || — || align=right | 2.4 km || 
|-id=322 bgcolor=#E9E9E9
| 383322 ||  || — || April 26, 2006 || Cerro Tololo || M. W. Buie || GEF || align=right | 1.6 km || 
|-id=323 bgcolor=#E9E9E9
| 383323 ||  || — || May 2, 2006 || Nyukasa || Mount Nyukasa Stn. || ADE || align=right | 2.8 km || 
|-id=324 bgcolor=#d6d6d6
| 383324 ||  || — || April 24, 2006 || Kitt Peak || Spacewatch || BRA || align=right | 1.5 km || 
|-id=325 bgcolor=#E9E9E9
| 383325 ||  || — || May 7, 2006 || Kitt Peak || Spacewatch || — || align=right | 3.2 km || 
|-id=326 bgcolor=#E9E9E9
| 383326 ||  || — || May 20, 2006 || Kitt Peak || Spacewatch || — || align=right | 2.7 km || 
|-id=327 bgcolor=#E9E9E9
| 383327 ||  || — || May 20, 2006 || Catalina || CSS || — || align=right | 2.4 km || 
|-id=328 bgcolor=#E9E9E9
| 383328 ||  || — || May 21, 2006 || Kitt Peak || Spacewatch || — || align=right | 2.7 km || 
|-id=329 bgcolor=#E9E9E9
| 383329 ||  || — || May 19, 2006 || Anderson Mesa || LONEOS || — || align=right | 1.8 km || 
|-id=330 bgcolor=#E9E9E9
| 383330 ||  || — || May 19, 2006 || Mount Lemmon || Mount Lemmon Survey || — || align=right | 1.7 km || 
|-id=331 bgcolor=#E9E9E9
| 383331 ||  || — || May 21, 2006 || Kitt Peak || Spacewatch || AGN || align=right | 1.4 km || 
|-id=332 bgcolor=#E9E9E9
| 383332 ||  || — || January 16, 2005 || Kitt Peak || Spacewatch || AGN || align=right | 1.2 km || 
|-id=333 bgcolor=#E9E9E9
| 383333 ||  || — || May 22, 2006 || Kitt Peak || Spacewatch || WIT || align=right | 1.3 km || 
|-id=334 bgcolor=#E9E9E9
| 383334 ||  || — || May 22, 2006 || Kitt Peak || Spacewatch || — || align=right | 1.6 km || 
|-id=335 bgcolor=#d6d6d6
| 383335 ||  || — || May 24, 2006 || Mount Lemmon || Mount Lemmon Survey || KOR || align=right | 1.4 km || 
|-id=336 bgcolor=#E9E9E9
| 383336 ||  || — || May 21, 2006 || Kitt Peak || Spacewatch || — || align=right | 2.8 km || 
|-id=337 bgcolor=#fefefe
| 383337 ||  || — || April 20, 2006 || Kitt Peak || Spacewatch || H || align=right data-sort-value="0.68" | 680 m || 
|-id=338 bgcolor=#E9E9E9
| 383338 ||  || — || May 26, 2006 || Catalina || CSS || — || align=right | 1.9 km || 
|-id=339 bgcolor=#d6d6d6
| 383339 ||  || — || August 13, 2006 || Palomar || NEAT || ALA || align=right | 3.8 km || 
|-id=340 bgcolor=#d6d6d6
| 383340 ||  || — || August 13, 2006 || Palomar || NEAT || — || align=right | 3.6 km || 
|-id=341 bgcolor=#E9E9E9
| 383341 ||  || — || August 13, 2006 || Palomar || NEAT || WAT || align=right | 2.5 km || 
|-id=342 bgcolor=#d6d6d6
| 383342 ||  || — || August 19, 2006 || Palomar || NEAT || — || align=right | 4.6 km || 
|-id=343 bgcolor=#fefefe
| 383343 ||  || — || August 16, 2006 || Palomar || NEAT || — || align=right | 1.1 km || 
|-id=344 bgcolor=#fefefe
| 383344 ||  || — || August 27, 2006 || Kitt Peak || Spacewatch || — || align=right data-sort-value="0.59" | 590 m || 
|-id=345 bgcolor=#d6d6d6
| 383345 ||  || — || August 28, 2006 || Catalina || CSS || — || align=right | 3.2 km || 
|-id=346 bgcolor=#d6d6d6
| 383346 ||  || — || August 28, 2006 || Kitt Peak || Spacewatch || — || align=right | 2.2 km || 
|-id=347 bgcolor=#d6d6d6
| 383347 ||  || — || August 19, 2006 || Kitt Peak || Spacewatch || — || align=right | 2.5 km || 
|-id=348 bgcolor=#fefefe
| 383348 ||  || — || August 26, 2006 || Siding Spring || SSS || PHO || align=right | 1.2 km || 
|-id=349 bgcolor=#fefefe
| 383349 ||  || — || September 12, 2006 || Catalina || CSS || FLO || align=right data-sort-value="0.63" | 630 m || 
|-id=350 bgcolor=#d6d6d6
| 383350 ||  || — || August 29, 2006 || Kitt Peak || Spacewatch || — || align=right | 3.2 km || 
|-id=351 bgcolor=#fefefe
| 383351 ||  || — || September 14, 2006 || Catalina || CSS || — || align=right data-sort-value="0.79" | 790 m || 
|-id=352 bgcolor=#d6d6d6
| 383352 ||  || — || September 15, 2006 || Kitt Peak || Spacewatch || EOS || align=right | 2.0 km || 
|-id=353 bgcolor=#d6d6d6
| 383353 ||  || — || September 14, 2006 || Kitt Peak || Spacewatch || EOS || align=right | 2.3 km || 
|-id=354 bgcolor=#fefefe
| 383354 ||  || — || September 14, 2006 || Kitt Peak || Spacewatch || — || align=right data-sort-value="0.79" | 790 m || 
|-id=355 bgcolor=#d6d6d6
| 383355 ||  || — || September 15, 2006 || Kitt Peak || Spacewatch || — || align=right | 3.6 km || 
|-id=356 bgcolor=#fefefe
| 383356 ||  || — || September 6, 2006 || Palomar || NEAT || — || align=right data-sort-value="0.95" | 950 m || 
|-id=357 bgcolor=#fefefe
| 383357 ||  || — || September 16, 2006 || Catalina || CSS || — || align=right | 1.1 km || 
|-id=358 bgcolor=#d6d6d6
| 383358 ||  || — || September 16, 2006 || Kitt Peak || Spacewatch || — || align=right | 2.8 km || 
|-id=359 bgcolor=#d6d6d6
| 383359 ||  || — || September 16, 2006 || Kitt Peak || Spacewatch || HYG || align=right | 3.3 km || 
|-id=360 bgcolor=#fefefe
| 383360 ||  || — || September 17, 2006 || Kitt Peak || Spacewatch || — || align=right data-sort-value="0.87" | 870 m || 
|-id=361 bgcolor=#fefefe
| 383361 ||  || — || September 30, 2003 || Kitt Peak || Spacewatch || — || align=right data-sort-value="0.65" | 650 m || 
|-id=362 bgcolor=#fefefe
| 383362 ||  || — || September 18, 2006 || Catalina || CSS || — || align=right data-sort-value="0.67" | 670 m || 
|-id=363 bgcolor=#d6d6d6
| 383363 ||  || — || September 18, 2006 || Kitt Peak || Spacewatch || — || align=right | 3.2 km || 
|-id=364 bgcolor=#fefefe
| 383364 ||  || — || September 16, 2006 || Anderson Mesa || LONEOS || — || align=right data-sort-value="0.91" | 910 m || 
|-id=365 bgcolor=#fefefe
| 383365 ||  || — || September 18, 2006 || Catalina || CSS || — || align=right data-sort-value="0.79" | 790 m || 
|-id=366 bgcolor=#fefefe
| 383366 ||  || — || September 19, 2006 || Kitt Peak || Spacewatch || FLO || align=right data-sort-value="0.65" | 650 m || 
|-id=367 bgcolor=#fefefe
| 383367 ||  || — || September 21, 2006 || Anderson Mesa || LONEOS || FLO || align=right data-sort-value="0.80" | 800 m || 
|-id=368 bgcolor=#d6d6d6
| 383368 ||  || — || September 24, 2006 || Kitt Peak || Spacewatch || — || align=right | 2.6 km || 
|-id=369 bgcolor=#fefefe
| 383369 ||  || — || September 18, 2006 || Catalina || CSS || FLO || align=right data-sort-value="0.84" | 840 m || 
|-id=370 bgcolor=#fefefe
| 383370 ||  || — || September 17, 2006 || Catalina || CSS || FLO || align=right data-sort-value="0.69" | 690 m || 
|-id=371 bgcolor=#fefefe
| 383371 ||  || — || September 24, 2006 || Kitt Peak || Spacewatch || — || align=right data-sort-value="0.67" | 670 m || 
|-id=372 bgcolor=#d6d6d6
| 383372 ||  || — || September 25, 2006 || Kitt Peak || Spacewatch || — || align=right | 3.8 km || 
|-id=373 bgcolor=#d6d6d6
| 383373 ||  || — || September 25, 2006 || Kitt Peak || Spacewatch || — || align=right | 2.9 km || 
|-id=374 bgcolor=#d6d6d6
| 383374 ||  || — || September 17, 2006 || Catalina || CSS || — || align=right | 3.3 km || 
|-id=375 bgcolor=#fefefe
| 383375 ||  || — || September 27, 2006 || Kitt Peak || Spacewatch || — || align=right data-sort-value="0.75" | 750 m || 
|-id=376 bgcolor=#fefefe
| 383376 ||  || — || September 18, 2006 || Kitt Peak || Spacewatch || FLO || align=right data-sort-value="0.61" | 610 m || 
|-id=377 bgcolor=#fefefe
| 383377 ||  || — || September 26, 2006 || Kitt Peak || Spacewatch || — || align=right data-sort-value="0.71" | 710 m || 
|-id=378 bgcolor=#fefefe
| 383378 ||  || — || September 26, 2006 || Mount Lemmon || Mount Lemmon Survey || — || align=right data-sort-value="0.68" | 680 m || 
|-id=379 bgcolor=#d6d6d6
| 383379 ||  || — || September 26, 2006 || Catalina || CSS || — || align=right | 3.4 km || 
|-id=380 bgcolor=#d6d6d6
| 383380 ||  || — || September 27, 2006 || Kitt Peak || Spacewatch || HYG || align=right | 2.9 km || 
|-id=381 bgcolor=#fefefe
| 383381 ||  || — || December 17, 2003 || Socorro || LINEAR || FLO || align=right data-sort-value="0.64" | 640 m || 
|-id=382 bgcolor=#d6d6d6
| 383382 ||  || — || September 17, 2006 || Apache Point || A. C. Becker || — || align=right | 3.0 km || 
|-id=383 bgcolor=#d6d6d6
| 383383 ||  || — || September 29, 2006 || Apache Point || A. C. Becker || — || align=right | 3.1 km || 
|-id=384 bgcolor=#d6d6d6
| 383384 ||  || — || September 17, 2006 || Kitt Peak || Spacewatch || — || align=right | 3.3 km || 
|-id=385 bgcolor=#fefefe
| 383385 ||  || — || September 27, 2006 || Mount Lemmon || Mount Lemmon Survey || FLO || align=right data-sort-value="0.64" | 640 m || 
|-id=386 bgcolor=#fefefe
| 383386 ||  || — || October 4, 2006 || Mount Lemmon || Mount Lemmon Survey || FLO || align=right data-sort-value="0.70" | 700 m || 
|-id=387 bgcolor=#d6d6d6
| 383387 ||  || — || October 11, 2006 || Kitt Peak || Spacewatch || — || align=right | 3.4 km || 
|-id=388 bgcolor=#d6d6d6
| 383388 ||  || — || September 30, 2006 || Catalina || CSS || — || align=right | 3.9 km || 
|-id=389 bgcolor=#fefefe
| 383389 ||  || — || October 11, 2006 || Kitt Peak || Spacewatch || — || align=right data-sort-value="0.82" | 820 m || 
|-id=390 bgcolor=#fefefe
| 383390 ||  || — || October 11, 2006 || Kitt Peak || Spacewatch || FLO || align=right data-sort-value="0.67" | 670 m || 
|-id=391 bgcolor=#fefefe
| 383391 ||  || — || September 30, 2006 || Mount Lemmon || Mount Lemmon Survey || — || align=right data-sort-value="0.69" | 690 m || 
|-id=392 bgcolor=#fefefe
| 383392 ||  || — || October 11, 2006 || Kitt Peak || Spacewatch || — || align=right data-sort-value="0.77" | 770 m || 
|-id=393 bgcolor=#fefefe
| 383393 ||  || — || September 30, 2006 || Mount Lemmon || Mount Lemmon Survey || fast? || align=right data-sort-value="0.77" | 770 m || 
|-id=394 bgcolor=#d6d6d6
| 383394 ||  || — || October 12, 2006 || Kitt Peak || Spacewatch || — || align=right | 4.5 km || 
|-id=395 bgcolor=#fefefe
| 383395 ||  || — || October 13, 2006 || Eskridge || Farpoint Obs. || — || align=right data-sort-value="0.82" | 820 m || 
|-id=396 bgcolor=#d6d6d6
| 383396 ||  || — || October 10, 2006 || Palomar || NEAT || EOS || align=right | 2.6 km || 
|-id=397 bgcolor=#fefefe
| 383397 ||  || — || October 11, 2006 || Palomar || NEAT || — || align=right data-sort-value="0.56" | 560 m || 
|-id=398 bgcolor=#fefefe
| 383398 ||  || — || October 11, 2006 || Palomar || NEAT || — || align=right data-sort-value="0.86" | 860 m || 
|-id=399 bgcolor=#fefefe
| 383399 ||  || — || October 13, 2006 || Kitt Peak || Spacewatch || FLO || align=right data-sort-value="0.69" | 690 m || 
|-id=400 bgcolor=#d6d6d6
| 383400 ||  || — || October 3, 2006 || Apache Point || A. C. Becker || — || align=right | 2.8 km || 
|}

383401–383500 

|-bgcolor=#fefefe
| 383401 ||  || — || October 16, 2006 || Catalina || CSS || — || align=right | 1.0 km || 
|-id=402 bgcolor=#d6d6d6
| 383402 ||  || — || September 25, 2006 || Kitt Peak || Spacewatch || EOS || align=right | 2.1 km || 
|-id=403 bgcolor=#d6d6d6
| 383403 ||  || — || October 16, 2006 || Kitt Peak || Spacewatch || — || align=right | 3.4 km || 
|-id=404 bgcolor=#d6d6d6
| 383404 ||  || — || October 16, 2006 || Kitt Peak || Spacewatch || — || align=right | 4.4 km || 
|-id=405 bgcolor=#fefefe
| 383405 ||  || — || August 27, 2006 || Anderson Mesa || LONEOS || — || align=right data-sort-value="0.83" | 830 m || 
|-id=406 bgcolor=#fefefe
| 383406 ||  || — || October 16, 2006 || Catalina || CSS || — || align=right data-sort-value="0.83" | 830 m || 
|-id=407 bgcolor=#fefefe
| 383407 ||  || — || October 16, 2006 || Catalina || CSS || — || align=right data-sort-value="0.81" | 810 m || 
|-id=408 bgcolor=#fefefe
| 383408 ||  || — || October 18, 2006 || Kitt Peak || Spacewatch || — || align=right data-sort-value="0.78" | 780 m || 
|-id=409 bgcolor=#fefefe
| 383409 ||  || — || October 19, 2006 || Kitt Peak || Spacewatch || — || align=right data-sort-value="0.70" | 700 m || 
|-id=410 bgcolor=#fefefe
| 383410 ||  || — || October 19, 2006 || Mount Lemmon || Mount Lemmon Survey || FLO || align=right data-sort-value="0.60" | 600 m || 
|-id=411 bgcolor=#FA8072
| 383411 ||  || — || October 16, 2006 || Catalina || CSS || — || align=right data-sort-value="0.85" | 850 m || 
|-id=412 bgcolor=#d6d6d6
| 383412 ||  || — || October 20, 2006 || Kitt Peak || Spacewatch || — || align=right | 3.2 km || 
|-id=413 bgcolor=#FA8072
| 383413 ||  || — || October 22, 2006 || Palomar || NEAT || — || align=right data-sort-value="0.75" | 750 m || 
|-id=414 bgcolor=#fefefe
| 383414 ||  || — || October 23, 2006 || Kitt Peak || Spacewatch || V || align=right data-sort-value="0.64" | 640 m || 
|-id=415 bgcolor=#fefefe
| 383415 ||  || — || October 23, 2006 || Kitt Peak || Spacewatch || — || align=right data-sort-value="0.78" | 780 m || 
|-id=416 bgcolor=#fefefe
| 383416 ||  || — || October 26, 2006 || Kitami || K. Endate || — || align=right data-sort-value="0.94" | 940 m || 
|-id=417 bgcolor=#d6d6d6
| 383417 DAO ||  ||  || October 23, 2006 || Mauna Kea || D. D. Balam || — || align=right | 3.3 km || 
|-id=418 bgcolor=#fefefe
| 383418 ||  || — || October 20, 2006 || Palomar || NEAT || fast? || align=right data-sort-value="0.78" | 780 m || 
|-id=419 bgcolor=#fefefe
| 383419 ||  || — || October 20, 2006 || Palomar || NEAT || — || align=right data-sort-value="0.85" | 850 m || 
|-id=420 bgcolor=#fefefe
| 383420 ||  || — || October 27, 2006 || Mount Lemmon || Mount Lemmon Survey || — || align=right data-sort-value="0.90" | 900 m || 
|-id=421 bgcolor=#fefefe
| 383421 ||  || — || October 16, 2006 || Kitt Peak || Spacewatch || — || align=right data-sort-value="0.61" | 610 m || 
|-id=422 bgcolor=#fefefe
| 383422 ||  || — || October 28, 2006 || Kitt Peak || Spacewatch || — || align=right data-sort-value="0.87" | 870 m || 
|-id=423 bgcolor=#fefefe
| 383423 ||  || — || October 28, 2006 || Kitt Peak || Spacewatch || — || align=right data-sort-value="0.80" | 800 m || 
|-id=424 bgcolor=#d6d6d6
| 383424 ||  || — || October 16, 2006 || Apache Point || A. C. Becker || — || align=right | 3.6 km || 
|-id=425 bgcolor=#fefefe
| 383425 ||  || — || October 21, 2006 || Kitt Peak || Spacewatch || FLO || align=right data-sort-value="0.68" | 680 m || 
|-id=426 bgcolor=#fefefe
| 383426 ||  || — || October 22, 2006 || Mount Lemmon || Mount Lemmon Survey || V || align=right data-sort-value="0.54" | 540 m || 
|-id=427 bgcolor=#fefefe
| 383427 ||  || — || November 10, 2006 || Kitt Peak || Spacewatch || NYS || align=right data-sort-value="0.52" | 520 m || 
|-id=428 bgcolor=#fefefe
| 383428 ||  || — || November 10, 2006 || Kitt Peak || Spacewatch || — || align=right data-sort-value="0.84" | 840 m || 
|-id=429 bgcolor=#fefefe
| 383429 ||  || — || November 11, 2006 || Kitt Peak || Spacewatch || — || align=right data-sort-value="0.89" | 890 m || 
|-id=430 bgcolor=#fefefe
| 383430 ||  || — || November 11, 2006 || Kitt Peak || Spacewatch || — || align=right data-sort-value="0.79" | 790 m || 
|-id=431 bgcolor=#fefefe
| 383431 ||  || — || September 28, 2006 || Mount Lemmon || Mount Lemmon Survey || — || align=right data-sort-value="0.76" | 760 m || 
|-id=432 bgcolor=#fefefe
| 383432 ||  || — || October 21, 2006 || Mount Lemmon || Mount Lemmon Survey || — || align=right data-sort-value="0.96" | 960 m || 
|-id=433 bgcolor=#d6d6d6
| 383433 ||  || — || November 12, 2006 || Lulin Observatory || H.-C. Lin, Q.-z. Ye || 7:4 || align=right | 3.3 km || 
|-id=434 bgcolor=#fefefe
| 383434 ||  || — || September 18, 2006 || Catalina || CSS || — || align=right | 1.1 km || 
|-id=435 bgcolor=#fefefe
| 383435 ||  || — || November 14, 2006 || Kitt Peak || Spacewatch || — || align=right data-sort-value="0.76" | 760 m || 
|-id=436 bgcolor=#fefefe
| 383436 ||  || — || November 15, 2006 || Mount Lemmon || Mount Lemmon Survey || FLO || align=right data-sort-value="0.67" | 670 m || 
|-id=437 bgcolor=#fefefe
| 383437 ||  || — || November 15, 2006 || Kitt Peak || Spacewatch || — || align=right data-sort-value="0.73" | 730 m || 
|-id=438 bgcolor=#FA8072
| 383438 ||  || — || October 19, 2006 || Mount Lemmon || Mount Lemmon Survey || — || align=right data-sort-value="0.86" | 860 m || 
|-id=439 bgcolor=#fefefe
| 383439 ||  || — || November 13, 2006 || Palomar || NEAT || — || align=right data-sort-value="0.85" | 850 m || 
|-id=440 bgcolor=#fefefe
| 383440 ||  || — || November 16, 2006 || Socorro || LINEAR || FLO || align=right data-sort-value="0.76" | 760 m || 
|-id=441 bgcolor=#d6d6d6
| 383441 ||  || — || September 18, 2006 || Kitt Peak || Spacewatch || — || align=right | 2.7 km || 
|-id=442 bgcolor=#fefefe
| 383442 ||  || — || November 16, 2006 || Kitt Peak || Spacewatch || — || align=right | 1.1 km || 
|-id=443 bgcolor=#fefefe
| 383443 ||  || — || November 16, 2006 || Kitt Peak || Spacewatch || — || align=right data-sort-value="0.83" | 830 m || 
|-id=444 bgcolor=#fefefe
| 383444 ||  || — || November 16, 2006 || Kitt Peak || Spacewatch || — || align=right data-sort-value="0.67" | 670 m || 
|-id=445 bgcolor=#fefefe
| 383445 ||  || — || November 17, 2006 || Mount Lemmon || Mount Lemmon Survey || — || align=right data-sort-value="0.77" | 770 m || 
|-id=446 bgcolor=#fefefe
| 383446 ||  || — || November 18, 2006 || Mount Lemmon || Mount Lemmon Survey || — || align=right data-sort-value="0.75" | 750 m || 
|-id=447 bgcolor=#fefefe
| 383447 ||  || — || November 19, 2006 || Kitt Peak || Spacewatch || NYS || align=right data-sort-value="0.64" | 640 m || 
|-id=448 bgcolor=#fefefe
| 383448 ||  || — || November 19, 2006 || Kitt Peak || Spacewatch || FLO || align=right data-sort-value="0.81" | 810 m || 
|-id=449 bgcolor=#FA8072
| 383449 ||  || — || November 24, 2006 || Siding Spring || SSS || — || align=right | 1.7 km || 
|-id=450 bgcolor=#fefefe
| 383450 ||  || — || November 23, 2006 || Kitt Peak || Spacewatch || — || align=right data-sort-value="0.72" | 720 m || 
|-id=451 bgcolor=#fefefe
| 383451 ||  || — || November 21, 2006 || Mount Lemmon || Mount Lemmon Survey || — || align=right data-sort-value="0.85" | 850 m || 
|-id=452 bgcolor=#fefefe
| 383452 ||  || — || November 17, 2006 || Kitt Peak || Spacewatch || FLO || align=right data-sort-value="0.57" | 570 m || 
|-id=453 bgcolor=#fefefe
| 383453 ||  || — || November 16, 2006 || Mount Lemmon || Mount Lemmon Survey || — || align=right data-sort-value="0.81" | 810 m || 
|-id=454 bgcolor=#d6d6d6
| 383454 ||  || — || November 19, 2006 || Kitt Peak || Spacewatch || 7:4 || align=right | 3.0 km || 
|-id=455 bgcolor=#fefefe
| 383455 ||  || — || December 10, 2006 || Kitt Peak || Spacewatch || — || align=right | 1.1 km || 
|-id=456 bgcolor=#fefefe
| 383456 ||  || — || December 9, 2006 || Kitt Peak || Spacewatch || — || align=right data-sort-value="0.96" | 960 m || 
|-id=457 bgcolor=#fefefe
| 383457 ||  || — || October 23, 2006 || Mount Lemmon || Mount Lemmon Survey || — || align=right data-sort-value="0.92" | 920 m || 
|-id=458 bgcolor=#fefefe
| 383458 ||  || — || December 12, 2006 || Kitt Peak || Spacewatch || FLO || align=right data-sort-value="0.83" | 830 m || 
|-id=459 bgcolor=#fefefe
| 383459 ||  || — || December 13, 2006 || Mount Lemmon || Mount Lemmon Survey || V || align=right data-sort-value="0.67" | 670 m || 
|-id=460 bgcolor=#fefefe
| 383460 ||  || — || December 10, 2006 || Kitt Peak || Spacewatch || — || align=right data-sort-value="0.65" | 650 m || 
|-id=461 bgcolor=#fefefe
| 383461 ||  || — || December 16, 2006 || Kitt Peak || Spacewatch || V || align=right data-sort-value="0.59" | 590 m || 
|-id=462 bgcolor=#fefefe
| 383462 ||  || — || December 16, 2006 || Mount Lemmon || Mount Lemmon Survey || FLO || align=right | 1.9 km || 
|-id=463 bgcolor=#fefefe
| 383463 ||  || — || December 20, 2006 || Nyukasa || Mount Nyukasa Stn. || — || align=right | 1.2 km || 
|-id=464 bgcolor=#FA8072
| 383464 ||  || — || December 22, 2006 || Socorro || LINEAR || PHO || align=right | 1.2 km || 
|-id=465 bgcolor=#fefefe
| 383465 ||  || — || December 24, 2006 || Mount Lemmon || Mount Lemmon Survey || — || align=right data-sort-value="0.85" | 850 m || 
|-id=466 bgcolor=#fefefe
| 383466 ||  || — || December 21, 2006 || Kitt Peak || Spacewatch || — || align=right data-sort-value="0.76" | 760 m || 
|-id=467 bgcolor=#fefefe
| 383467 ||  || — || December 21, 2006 || Kitt Peak || Spacewatch || — || align=right data-sort-value="0.78" | 780 m || 
|-id=468 bgcolor=#fefefe
| 383468 ||  || — || December 21, 2006 || Kitt Peak || Spacewatch || — || align=right | 1.2 km || 
|-id=469 bgcolor=#fefefe
| 383469 ||  || — || December 22, 2006 || Kitt Peak || Spacewatch || FLO || align=right data-sort-value="0.76" | 760 m || 
|-id=470 bgcolor=#fefefe
| 383470 ||  || — || December 10, 2006 || Kitt Peak || Spacewatch || — || align=right | 1.1 km || 
|-id=471 bgcolor=#fefefe
| 383471 ||  || — || December 24, 2006 || Mount Lemmon || Mount Lemmon Survey || — || align=right | 1.0 km || 
|-id=472 bgcolor=#fefefe
| 383472 ||  || — || December 27, 2006 || Mount Lemmon || Mount Lemmon Survey || NYS || align=right data-sort-value="0.63" | 630 m || 
|-id=473 bgcolor=#fefefe
| 383473 ||  || — || January 8, 2007 || Mount Lemmon || Mount Lemmon Survey || FLO || align=right data-sort-value="0.68" | 680 m || 
|-id=474 bgcolor=#fefefe
| 383474 ||  || — || January 8, 2007 || Mount Lemmon || Mount Lemmon Survey || — || align=right data-sort-value="0.80" | 800 m || 
|-id=475 bgcolor=#fefefe
| 383475 ||  || — || January 11, 2007 || Gnosca || S. Sposetti || — || align=right data-sort-value="0.76" | 760 m || 
|-id=476 bgcolor=#fefefe
| 383476 ||  || — || January 10, 2007 || Mount Lemmon || Mount Lemmon Survey || FLO || align=right data-sort-value="0.67" | 670 m || 
|-id=477 bgcolor=#fefefe
| 383477 ||  || — || January 9, 2007 || Kitt Peak || Spacewatch || — || align=right data-sort-value="0.73" | 730 m || 
|-id=478 bgcolor=#fefefe
| 383478 ||  || — || January 10, 2007 || Mount Lemmon || Mount Lemmon Survey || MAS || align=right data-sort-value="0.69" | 690 m || 
|-id=479 bgcolor=#fefefe
| 383479 ||  || — || January 16, 2007 || Socorro || LINEAR || V || align=right data-sort-value="0.81" | 810 m || 
|-id=480 bgcolor=#fefefe
| 383480 ||  || — || January 16, 2007 || Mount Lemmon || Mount Lemmon Survey || — || align=right | 1.0 km || 
|-id=481 bgcolor=#fefefe
| 383481 ||  || — || January 17, 2007 || Kitt Peak || Spacewatch || — || align=right data-sort-value="0.92" | 920 m || 
|-id=482 bgcolor=#d6d6d6
| 383482 ||  || — || January 17, 2007 || Kitt Peak || Spacewatch || SHU3:2 || align=right | 5.3 km || 
|-id=483 bgcolor=#fefefe
| 383483 ||  || — || January 17, 2007 || Kitt Peak || Spacewatch || — || align=right data-sort-value="0.82" | 820 m || 
|-id=484 bgcolor=#fefefe
| 383484 ||  || — || January 24, 2007 || Socorro || LINEAR || — || align=right data-sort-value="0.89" | 890 m || 
|-id=485 bgcolor=#fefefe
| 383485 ||  || — || January 24, 2007 || Mount Lemmon || Mount Lemmon Survey || — || align=right | 2.2 km || 
|-id=486 bgcolor=#fefefe
| 383486 ||  || — || January 24, 2007 || Mount Lemmon || Mount Lemmon Survey || MAS || align=right data-sort-value="0.75" | 750 m || 
|-id=487 bgcolor=#d6d6d6
| 383487 ||  || — || January 17, 2007 || Mount Lemmon || Mount Lemmon Survey || SHU3:2 || align=right | 4.7 km || 
|-id=488 bgcolor=#fefefe
| 383488 ||  || — || January 24, 2007 || Mount Lemmon || Mount Lemmon Survey || FLO || align=right data-sort-value="0.65" | 650 m || 
|-id=489 bgcolor=#fefefe
| 383489 ||  || — || January 24, 2007 || Mount Lemmon || Mount Lemmon Survey || — || align=right data-sort-value="0.68" | 680 m || 
|-id=490 bgcolor=#fefefe
| 383490 ||  || — || January 24, 2007 || Catalina || CSS || — || align=right data-sort-value="0.95" | 950 m || 
|-id=491 bgcolor=#fefefe
| 383491 ||  || — || January 26, 2007 || Kitt Peak || Spacewatch || V || align=right data-sort-value="0.66" | 660 m || 
|-id=492 bgcolor=#fefefe
| 383492 Aubert ||  ||  || January 21, 2007 || Nogales || J.-C. Merlin || MAS || align=right data-sort-value="0.77" | 770 m || 
|-id=493 bgcolor=#fefefe
| 383493 ||  || — || January 17, 2007 || Kitt Peak || Spacewatch || — || align=right data-sort-value="0.61" | 610 m || 
|-id=494 bgcolor=#fefefe
| 383494 ||  || — || November 27, 2006 || Mount Lemmon || Mount Lemmon Survey || — || align=right | 1.1 km || 
|-id=495 bgcolor=#fefefe
| 383495 ||  || — || January 24, 2007 || Socorro || LINEAR || — || align=right | 1.3 km || 
|-id=496 bgcolor=#fefefe
| 383496 ||  || — || January 10, 2007 || Mount Lemmon || Mount Lemmon Survey || NYS || align=right data-sort-value="0.49" | 490 m || 
|-id=497 bgcolor=#fefefe
| 383497 ||  || — || January 10, 2007 || Mount Lemmon || Mount Lemmon Survey || FLO || align=right data-sort-value="0.64" | 640 m || 
|-id=498 bgcolor=#fefefe
| 383498 ||  || — || January 17, 2007 || Kitt Peak || Spacewatch || NYS || align=right data-sort-value="0.58" | 580 m || 
|-id=499 bgcolor=#fefefe
| 383499 ||  || — || January 28, 2007 || Kitt Peak || Spacewatch || — || align=right data-sort-value="0.80" | 800 m || 
|-id=500 bgcolor=#fefefe
| 383500 ||  || — || January 17, 2007 || Kitt Peak || Spacewatch || — || align=right data-sort-value="0.82" | 820 m || 
|}

383501–383600 

|-bgcolor=#fefefe
| 383501 ||  || — || February 6, 2007 || Kitt Peak || Spacewatch || FLO || align=right data-sort-value="0.71" | 710 m || 
|-id=502 bgcolor=#fefefe
| 383502 ||  || — || February 6, 2007 || Kitt Peak || Spacewatch || — || align=right data-sort-value="0.88" | 880 m || 
|-id=503 bgcolor=#fefefe
| 383503 ||  || — || February 6, 2007 || Mount Lemmon || Mount Lemmon Survey || ERI || align=right | 1.4 km || 
|-id=504 bgcolor=#fefefe
| 383504 ||  || — || February 6, 2007 || Mount Lemmon || Mount Lemmon Survey || — || align=right data-sort-value="0.65" | 650 m || 
|-id=505 bgcolor=#fefefe
| 383505 ||  || — || February 6, 2007 || Mount Lemmon || Mount Lemmon Survey || — || align=right data-sort-value="0.72" | 720 m || 
|-id=506 bgcolor=#fefefe
| 383506 ||  || — || February 8, 2007 || Mount Lemmon || Mount Lemmon Survey || V || align=right data-sort-value="0.78" | 780 m || 
|-id=507 bgcolor=#fefefe
| 383507 ||  || — || February 8, 2007 || Mount Lemmon || Mount Lemmon Survey || V || align=right data-sort-value="0.75" | 750 m || 
|-id=508 bgcolor=#fefefe
| 383508 Vadrot ||  ||  || February 9, 2007 || Nogales || J.-C. Merlin || MAS || align=right data-sort-value="0.83" | 830 m || 
|-id=509 bgcolor=#fefefe
| 383509 ||  || — || February 6, 2007 || Palomar || NEAT || NYS || align=right data-sort-value="0.68" | 680 m || 
|-id=510 bgcolor=#fefefe
| 383510 ||  || — || February 6, 2007 || Mount Lemmon || Mount Lemmon Survey || — || align=right data-sort-value="0.86" | 860 m || 
|-id=511 bgcolor=#fefefe
| 383511 ||  || — || January 29, 2007 || Mount Lemmon || Mount Lemmon Survey || — || align=right data-sort-value="0.98" | 980 m || 
|-id=512 bgcolor=#fefefe
| 383512 ||  || — || February 9, 2007 || Kitt Peak || Spacewatch || — || align=right data-sort-value="0.80" | 800 m || 
|-id=513 bgcolor=#fefefe
| 383513 ||  || — || February 9, 2007 || Catalina || CSS || — || align=right | 1.1 km || 
|-id=514 bgcolor=#d6d6d6
| 383514 ||  || — || February 6, 2007 || Mount Lemmon || Mount Lemmon Survey || 3:2 || align=right | 5.1 km || 
|-id=515 bgcolor=#fefefe
| 383515 ||  || — || February 7, 2007 || Kitt Peak || Spacewatch || — || align=right data-sort-value="0.98" | 980 m || 
|-id=516 bgcolor=#fefefe
| 383516 ||  || — || February 8, 2007 || Palomar || NEAT || — || align=right | 1.2 km || 
|-id=517 bgcolor=#fefefe
| 383517 ||  || — || February 8, 2007 || Palomar || NEAT || — || align=right | 1.0 km || 
|-id=518 bgcolor=#FA8072
| 383518 ||  || — || February 10, 2007 || Palomar || NEAT || PHO || align=right | 1.2 km || 
|-id=519 bgcolor=#fefefe
| 383519 ||  || — || February 13, 2007 || Socorro || LINEAR || ERI || align=right | 1.6 km || 
|-id=520 bgcolor=#fefefe
| 383520 ||  || — || December 13, 2006 || Mount Lemmon || Mount Lemmon Survey || — || align=right data-sort-value="0.91" | 910 m || 
|-id=521 bgcolor=#fefefe
| 383521 ||  || — || February 13, 2007 || Mount Lemmon || Mount Lemmon Survey || NYS || align=right data-sort-value="0.51" | 510 m || 
|-id=522 bgcolor=#fefefe
| 383522 ||  || — || February 8, 2007 || Kitt Peak || Spacewatch || — || align=right data-sort-value="0.75" | 750 m || 
|-id=523 bgcolor=#fefefe
| 383523 ||  || — || February 16, 2007 || Catalina || CSS || — || align=right | 1.0 km || 
|-id=524 bgcolor=#fefefe
| 383524 ||  || — || February 17, 2007 || Kitt Peak || Spacewatch || — || align=right data-sort-value="0.67" | 670 m || 
|-id=525 bgcolor=#fefefe
| 383525 ||  || — || February 17, 2007 || Mount Lemmon || Mount Lemmon Survey || — || align=right | 2.8 km || 
|-id=526 bgcolor=#fefefe
| 383526 ||  || — || February 17, 2007 || Kitt Peak || Spacewatch || NYS || align=right data-sort-value="0.60" | 600 m || 
|-id=527 bgcolor=#fefefe
| 383527 ||  || — || February 17, 2007 || Kitt Peak || Spacewatch || — || align=right | 2.0 km || 
|-id=528 bgcolor=#E9E9E9
| 383528 ||  || — || February 17, 2007 || Kitt Peak || Spacewatch || — || align=right | 1.7 km || 
|-id=529 bgcolor=#fefefe
| 383529 ||  || — || February 19, 2007 || Mount Lemmon || Mount Lemmon Survey || NYS || align=right data-sort-value="0.69" | 690 m || 
|-id=530 bgcolor=#d6d6d6
| 383530 ||  || — || February 19, 2007 || Mount Lemmon || Mount Lemmon Survey || SHU3:2 || align=right | 4.5 km || 
|-id=531 bgcolor=#fefefe
| 383531 ||  || — || February 21, 2007 || Mount Lemmon || Mount Lemmon Survey || — || align=right | 1.1 km || 
|-id=532 bgcolor=#fefefe
| 383532 ||  || — || February 21, 2007 || Mount Lemmon || Mount Lemmon Survey || MAS || align=right data-sort-value="0.79" | 790 m || 
|-id=533 bgcolor=#fefefe
| 383533 ||  || — || February 19, 2007 || Mount Lemmon || Mount Lemmon Survey || NYS || align=right data-sort-value="0.74" | 740 m || 
|-id=534 bgcolor=#fefefe
| 383534 ||  || — || February 21, 2007 || Kitt Peak || Spacewatch || NYS || align=right data-sort-value="0.69" | 690 m || 
|-id=535 bgcolor=#fefefe
| 383535 ||  || — || February 21, 2007 || Kitt Peak || Spacewatch || NYS || align=right data-sort-value="0.72" | 720 m || 
|-id=536 bgcolor=#fefefe
| 383536 ||  || — || February 21, 2007 || Kitt Peak || Spacewatch || NYS || align=right data-sort-value="0.77" | 770 m || 
|-id=537 bgcolor=#fefefe
| 383537 ||  || — || October 1, 2005 || Catalina || CSS || — || align=right data-sort-value="0.97" | 970 m || 
|-id=538 bgcolor=#fefefe
| 383538 ||  || — || February 21, 2007 || Kitt Peak || Spacewatch || V || align=right data-sort-value="0.88" | 880 m || 
|-id=539 bgcolor=#fefefe
| 383539 ||  || — || February 21, 2007 || Kitt Peak || Spacewatch || — || align=right data-sort-value="0.86" | 860 m || 
|-id=540 bgcolor=#fefefe
| 383540 ||  || — || February 21, 2007 || Kitt Peak || Spacewatch || — || align=right data-sort-value="0.78" | 780 m || 
|-id=541 bgcolor=#fefefe
| 383541 ||  || — || January 23, 2007 || Anderson Mesa || LONEOS || — || align=right | 1.1 km || 
|-id=542 bgcolor=#fefefe
| 383542 ||  || — || February 25, 2007 || Mount Lemmon || Mount Lemmon Survey || MAS || align=right data-sort-value="0.87" | 870 m || 
|-id=543 bgcolor=#fefefe
| 383543 ||  || — || February 25, 2007 || Mount Lemmon || Mount Lemmon Survey || ERI || align=right | 1.8 km || 
|-id=544 bgcolor=#fefefe
| 383544 ||  || — || February 23, 2007 || Kitt Peak || Spacewatch || — || align=right data-sort-value="0.68" | 680 m || 
|-id=545 bgcolor=#fefefe
| 383545 ||  || — || February 23, 2007 || Mount Lemmon || Mount Lemmon Survey || MAS || align=right data-sort-value="0.81" | 810 m || 
|-id=546 bgcolor=#E9E9E9
| 383546 ||  || — || February 23, 2007 || Kitt Peak || Spacewatch || — || align=right | 1.2 km || 
|-id=547 bgcolor=#fefefe
| 383547 ||  || — || February 17, 2007 || Mount Lemmon || Mount Lemmon Survey || MAS || align=right data-sort-value="0.70" | 700 m || 
|-id=548 bgcolor=#fefefe
| 383548 ||  || — || March 9, 2007 || Mount Lemmon || Mount Lemmon Survey || NYS || align=right data-sort-value="0.49" | 490 m || 
|-id=549 bgcolor=#fefefe
| 383549 ||  || — || January 27, 2007 || Mount Lemmon || Mount Lemmon Survey || — || align=right data-sort-value="0.94" | 940 m || 
|-id=550 bgcolor=#fefefe
| 383550 ||  || — || March 9, 2007 || Mount Lemmon || Mount Lemmon Survey || MAS || align=right data-sort-value="0.77" | 770 m || 
|-id=551 bgcolor=#fefefe
| 383551 ||  || — || March 9, 2007 || Mount Lemmon || Mount Lemmon Survey || — || align=right data-sort-value="0.86" | 860 m || 
|-id=552 bgcolor=#fefefe
| 383552 ||  || — || March 9, 2007 || Kitt Peak || Spacewatch || — || align=right data-sort-value="0.78" | 780 m || 
|-id=553 bgcolor=#fefefe
| 383553 ||  || — || February 9, 2007 || Kitt Peak || Spacewatch || NYS || align=right data-sort-value="0.81" | 810 m || 
|-id=554 bgcolor=#fefefe
| 383554 ||  || — || March 9, 2007 || Mount Lemmon || Mount Lemmon Survey || NYS || align=right data-sort-value="0.61" | 610 m || 
|-id=555 bgcolor=#fefefe
| 383555 ||  || — || February 7, 2007 || Kitt Peak || Spacewatch || — || align=right data-sort-value="0.76" | 760 m || 
|-id=556 bgcolor=#fefefe
| 383556 ||  || — || March 9, 2007 || Mount Lemmon || Mount Lemmon Survey || — || align=right data-sort-value="0.67" | 670 m || 
|-id=557 bgcolor=#fefefe
| 383557 ||  || — || March 12, 2007 || Mount Lemmon || Mount Lemmon Survey || NYS || align=right data-sort-value="0.56" | 560 m || 
|-id=558 bgcolor=#fefefe
| 383558 ||  || — || March 9, 2007 || Mount Lemmon || Mount Lemmon Survey || NYS || align=right data-sort-value="0.65" | 650 m || 
|-id=559 bgcolor=#fefefe
| 383559 ||  || — || March 9, 2007 || Mount Lemmon || Mount Lemmon Survey || — || align=right data-sort-value="0.96" | 960 m || 
|-id=560 bgcolor=#fefefe
| 383560 ||  || — || March 10, 2007 || Kitt Peak || Spacewatch || ERI || align=right | 2.0 km || 
|-id=561 bgcolor=#fefefe
| 383561 ||  || — || February 26, 2007 || Mount Lemmon || Mount Lemmon Survey || NYS || align=right data-sort-value="0.60" | 600 m || 
|-id=562 bgcolor=#fefefe
| 383562 ||  || — || March 11, 2007 || Mount Lemmon || Mount Lemmon Survey || — || align=right data-sort-value="0.71" | 710 m || 
|-id=563 bgcolor=#fefefe
| 383563 ||  || — || March 9, 2007 || Mount Lemmon || Mount Lemmon Survey || NYS || align=right data-sort-value="0.57" | 570 m || 
|-id=564 bgcolor=#fefefe
| 383564 ||  || — || March 10, 2007 || Mount Lemmon || Mount Lemmon Survey || MAS || align=right data-sort-value="0.63" | 630 m || 
|-id=565 bgcolor=#fefefe
| 383565 ||  || — || March 10, 2007 || Kitt Peak || Spacewatch || ERI || align=right | 1.6 km || 
|-id=566 bgcolor=#fefefe
| 383566 ||  || — || March 12, 2007 || Mount Lemmon || Mount Lemmon Survey || NYS || align=right data-sort-value="0.77" | 770 m || 
|-id=567 bgcolor=#fefefe
| 383567 ||  || — || March 12, 2007 || Kitt Peak || Spacewatch || — || align=right data-sort-value="0.82" | 820 m || 
|-id=568 bgcolor=#fefefe
| 383568 ||  || — || March 14, 2007 || Mount Lemmon || Mount Lemmon Survey || — || align=right data-sort-value="0.68" | 680 m || 
|-id=569 bgcolor=#fefefe
| 383569 ||  || — || January 29, 2007 || Kitt Peak || Spacewatch || V || align=right data-sort-value="0.80" | 800 m || 
|-id=570 bgcolor=#fefefe
| 383570 ||  || — || March 14, 2007 || Mount Lemmon || Mount Lemmon Survey || MAS || align=right data-sort-value="0.75" | 750 m || 
|-id=571 bgcolor=#fefefe
| 383571 ||  || — || March 14, 2007 || Kitt Peak || Spacewatch || NYS || align=right data-sort-value="0.67" | 670 m || 
|-id=572 bgcolor=#FA8072
| 383572 ||  || — || March 13, 2007 || Catalina || CSS || PHO || align=right | 1.2 km || 
|-id=573 bgcolor=#fefefe
| 383573 ||  || — || March 13, 2007 || Mount Lemmon || Mount Lemmon Survey || — || align=right data-sort-value="0.75" | 750 m || 
|-id=574 bgcolor=#fefefe
| 383574 ||  || — || March 13, 2007 || Kitt Peak || Spacewatch || — || align=right data-sort-value="0.80" | 800 m || 
|-id=575 bgcolor=#fefefe
| 383575 ||  || — || March 15, 2007 || Kitt Peak || Spacewatch || — || align=right data-sort-value="0.84" | 840 m || 
|-id=576 bgcolor=#fefefe
| 383576 ||  || — || March 14, 2007 || Kitt Peak || Spacewatch || NYS || align=right data-sort-value="0.59" | 590 m || 
|-id=577 bgcolor=#fefefe
| 383577 ||  || — || March 8, 2007 || Palomar || NEAT || — || align=right data-sort-value="0.85" | 850 m || 
|-id=578 bgcolor=#fefefe
| 383578 ||  || — || March 11, 2007 || Mount Lemmon || Mount Lemmon Survey || MAS || align=right data-sort-value="0.80" | 800 m || 
|-id=579 bgcolor=#fefefe
| 383579 ||  || — || March 17, 2007 || Anderson Mesa || LONEOS || — || align=right | 1.1 km || 
|-id=580 bgcolor=#FA8072
| 383580 ||  || — || March 17, 2007 || Anderson Mesa || LONEOS || — || align=right | 1.2 km || 
|-id=581 bgcolor=#fefefe
| 383581 ||  || — || March 20, 2007 || Kitt Peak || Spacewatch || MAS || align=right data-sort-value="0.76" | 760 m || 
|-id=582 bgcolor=#fefefe
| 383582 ||  || — || March 26, 2007 || Mount Lemmon || Mount Lemmon Survey || EUT || align=right data-sort-value="0.63" | 630 m || 
|-id=583 bgcolor=#fefefe
| 383583 ||  || — || March 26, 2007 || Mount Lemmon || Mount Lemmon Survey || MAS || align=right data-sort-value="0.69" | 690 m || 
|-id=584 bgcolor=#E9E9E9
| 383584 ||  || — || April 9, 2007 || Črni Vrh || Črni Vrh || — || align=right | 4.2 km || 
|-id=585 bgcolor=#fefefe
| 383585 ||  || — || April 7, 2007 || Mount Lemmon || Mount Lemmon Survey || V || align=right data-sort-value="0.92" | 920 m || 
|-id=586 bgcolor=#fefefe
| 383586 ||  || — || April 11, 2007 || Kitt Peak || Spacewatch || ERI || align=right | 1.6 km || 
|-id=587 bgcolor=#E9E9E9
| 383587 ||  || — || March 11, 2007 || Mount Lemmon || Mount Lemmon Survey || MAR || align=right | 1.4 km || 
|-id=588 bgcolor=#fefefe
| 383588 ||  || — || April 11, 2007 || Kitt Peak || Spacewatch || MAS || align=right data-sort-value="0.90" | 900 m || 
|-id=589 bgcolor=#fefefe
| 383589 ||  || — || April 11, 2007 || Mount Lemmon || Mount Lemmon Survey || — || align=right data-sort-value="0.86" | 860 m || 
|-id=590 bgcolor=#E9E9E9
| 383590 ||  || — || April 14, 2007 || Kitt Peak || Spacewatch || — || align=right | 1.7 km || 
|-id=591 bgcolor=#E9E9E9
| 383591 ||  || — || March 14, 2007 || Mount Lemmon || Mount Lemmon Survey || MRX || align=right | 1.5 km || 
|-id=592 bgcolor=#fefefe
| 383592 ||  || — || April 15, 2007 || Kitt Peak || Spacewatch || — || align=right | 1.0 km || 
|-id=593 bgcolor=#fefefe
| 383593 ||  || — || April 15, 2007 || Catalina || CSS || NYS || align=right data-sort-value="0.70" | 700 m || 
|-id=594 bgcolor=#fefefe
| 383594 ||  || — || April 15, 2007 || Mount Lemmon || Mount Lemmon Survey || — || align=right data-sort-value="0.76" | 760 m || 
|-id=595 bgcolor=#fefefe
| 383595 ||  || — || April 16, 2007 || Catalina || CSS || — || align=right | 1.0 km || 
|-id=596 bgcolor=#fefefe
| 383596 ||  || — || April 16, 2007 || Mount Lemmon || Mount Lemmon Survey || — || align=right data-sort-value="0.70" | 700 m || 
|-id=597 bgcolor=#E9E9E9
| 383597 ||  || — || April 18, 2007 || Kitt Peak || Spacewatch || — || align=right | 2.4 km || 
|-id=598 bgcolor=#fefefe
| 383598 ||  || — || April 20, 2007 || Saint-Sulpice || B. Christophe || — || align=right data-sort-value="0.85" | 850 m || 
|-id=599 bgcolor=#E9E9E9
| 383599 ||  || — || April 18, 2007 || Kitt Peak || Spacewatch || — || align=right | 1.3 km || 
|-id=600 bgcolor=#fefefe
| 383600 ||  || — || April 18, 2007 || Kitt Peak || Spacewatch || NYS || align=right data-sort-value="0.72" | 720 m || 
|}

383601–383700 

|-bgcolor=#fefefe
| 383601 ||  || — || April 19, 2007 || Mount Lemmon || Mount Lemmon Survey || NYS || align=right data-sort-value="0.63" | 630 m || 
|-id=602 bgcolor=#fefefe
| 383602 ||  || — || April 19, 2007 || Kitt Peak || Spacewatch || — || align=right | 1.0 km || 
|-id=603 bgcolor=#E9E9E9
| 383603 ||  || — || April 19, 2007 || Kitt Peak || Spacewatch || — || align=right | 1.00 km || 
|-id=604 bgcolor=#fefefe
| 383604 ||  || — || April 22, 2007 || Mount Lemmon || Mount Lemmon Survey || NYS || align=right data-sort-value="0.59" | 590 m || 
|-id=605 bgcolor=#E9E9E9
| 383605 ||  || — || April 23, 2007 || Kitt Peak || Spacewatch || — || align=right | 3.0 km || 
|-id=606 bgcolor=#E9E9E9
| 383606 ||  || — || April 23, 2007 || Kitt Peak || Spacewatch || — || align=right data-sort-value="0.91" | 910 m || 
|-id=607 bgcolor=#fefefe
| 383607 ||  || — || May 5, 2007 || Bergisch Gladbach || W. Bickel || — || align=right data-sort-value="0.94" | 940 m || 
|-id=608 bgcolor=#E9E9E9
| 383608 ||  || — || May 7, 2007 || Mount Lemmon || Mount Lemmon Survey || ADE || align=right | 2.5 km || 
|-id=609 bgcolor=#fefefe
| 383609 ||  || — || May 11, 2007 || Mount Lemmon || Mount Lemmon Survey || NYS || align=right data-sort-value="0.64" | 640 m || 
|-id=610 bgcolor=#FFC2E0
| 383610 ||  || — || May 14, 2007 || Siding Spring || SSS || AMO || align=right data-sort-value="0.74" | 740 m || 
|-id=611 bgcolor=#fefefe
| 383611 ||  || — || May 11, 2007 || Kitt Peak || Spacewatch || H || align=right data-sort-value="0.65" | 650 m || 
|-id=612 bgcolor=#E9E9E9
| 383612 ||  || — || May 21, 2007 || Catalina || CSS || — || align=right | 4.1 km || 
|-id=613 bgcolor=#E9E9E9
| 383613 ||  || — || April 16, 2007 || Catalina || CSS || EUN || align=right | 1.6 km || 
|-id=614 bgcolor=#E9E9E9
| 383614 ||  || — || May 13, 2007 || Kitt Peak || Spacewatch || — || align=right | 1.5 km || 
|-id=615 bgcolor=#E9E9E9
| 383615 ||  || — || June 9, 2007 || Kitt Peak || Spacewatch || DOR || align=right | 2.7 km || 
|-id=616 bgcolor=#E9E9E9
| 383616 ||  || — || June 12, 2007 || Kitt Peak || Spacewatch || — || align=right | 2.1 km || 
|-id=617 bgcolor=#fefefe
| 383617 ||  || — || June 16, 2007 || Kitt Peak || Spacewatch || — || align=right data-sort-value="0.99" | 990 m || 
|-id=618 bgcolor=#E9E9E9
| 383618 ||  || — || June 21, 2007 || Mount Lemmon || Mount Lemmon Survey || EUN || align=right | 1.6 km || 
|-id=619 bgcolor=#E9E9E9
| 383619 ||  || — || June 23, 2007 || Siding Spring || SSS || — || align=right | 1.7 km || 
|-id=620 bgcolor=#E9E9E9
| 383620 ||  || — || July 13, 2007 || Wrightwood || J. W. Young || JNS || align=right | 2.3 km || 
|-id=621 bgcolor=#d6d6d6
| 383621 ||  || — || July 13, 2007 || Lulin || LUSS || Tj (2.94) || align=right | 8.0 km || 
|-id=622 bgcolor=#d6d6d6
| 383622 Luigivolta ||  ||  || August 11, 2007 || Vallemare di Borbona || V. S. Casulli || — || align=right | 2.7 km || 
|-id=623 bgcolor=#d6d6d6
| 383623 ||  || — || August 10, 2007 || Tiki || S. F. Hönig, N. Teamo || — || align=right | 3.4 km || 
|-id=624 bgcolor=#fefefe
| 383624 ||  || — || August 9, 2007 || Socorro || LINEAR || H || align=right data-sort-value="0.79" | 790 m || 
|-id=625 bgcolor=#d6d6d6
| 383625 ||  || — || August 8, 2007 || Socorro || LINEAR || — || align=right | 3.2 km || 
|-id=626 bgcolor=#d6d6d6
| 383626 ||  || — || May 4, 2006 || Kitt Peak || Spacewatch || — || align=right | 2.4 km || 
|-id=627 bgcolor=#d6d6d6
| 383627 ||  || — || March 8, 2005 || Kitt Peak || Spacewatch || — || align=right | 2.7 km || 
|-id=628 bgcolor=#d6d6d6
| 383628 ||  || — || September 10, 2007 || Mount Lemmon || Mount Lemmon Survey || — || align=right | 2.1 km || 
|-id=629 bgcolor=#fefefe
| 383629 ||  || — || September 10, 2007 || Mount Lemmon || Mount Lemmon Survey || — || align=right data-sort-value="0.98" | 980 m || 
|-id=630 bgcolor=#d6d6d6
| 383630 ||  || — || September 10, 2007 || Kitt Peak || Spacewatch || EOS || align=right | 1.6 km || 
|-id=631 bgcolor=#d6d6d6
| 383631 ||  || — || September 10, 2007 || Kitt Peak || Spacewatch || KOR || align=right | 1.4 km || 
|-id=632 bgcolor=#d6d6d6
| 383632 ||  || — || September 12, 2007 || Anderson Mesa || LONEOS || — || align=right | 3.4 km || 
|-id=633 bgcolor=#E9E9E9
| 383633 ||  || — || August 10, 2007 || Kitt Peak || Spacewatch || — || align=right | 2.2 km || 
|-id=634 bgcolor=#d6d6d6
| 383634 ||  || — || August 24, 2007 || Kitt Peak || Spacewatch || — || align=right | 2.3 km || 
|-id=635 bgcolor=#d6d6d6
| 383635 ||  || — || September 10, 2007 || Kitt Peak || Spacewatch || — || align=right | 3.3 km || 
|-id=636 bgcolor=#d6d6d6
| 383636 ||  || — || September 10, 2007 || Kitt Peak || Spacewatch || — || align=right | 2.7 km || 
|-id=637 bgcolor=#E9E9E9
| 383637 ||  || — || September 10, 2007 || Kitt Peak || Spacewatch || — || align=right | 2.9 km || 
|-id=638 bgcolor=#d6d6d6
| 383638 ||  || — || September 13, 2007 || Catalina || CSS || TIR || align=right | 3.0 km || 
|-id=639 bgcolor=#E9E9E9
| 383639 ||  || — || December 20, 2004 || Mount Lemmon || Mount Lemmon Survey || — || align=right | 2.5 km || 
|-id=640 bgcolor=#d6d6d6
| 383640 ||  || — || September 11, 2007 || Kitt Peak || Spacewatch || — || align=right | 2.5 km || 
|-id=641 bgcolor=#d6d6d6
| 383641 ||  || — || September 12, 2007 || Mount Lemmon || Mount Lemmon Survey || — || align=right | 2.4 km || 
|-id=642 bgcolor=#d6d6d6
| 383642 ||  || — || September 12, 2007 || Mount Lemmon || Mount Lemmon Survey || — || align=right | 2.0 km || 
|-id=643 bgcolor=#d6d6d6
| 383643 ||  || — || September 12, 2007 || Mount Lemmon || Mount Lemmon Survey || — || align=right | 2.5 km || 
|-id=644 bgcolor=#d6d6d6
| 383644 ||  || — || September 13, 2007 || Kitt Peak || Spacewatch || — || align=right | 2.0 km || 
|-id=645 bgcolor=#d6d6d6
| 383645 ||  || — || September 5, 2007 || Catalina || CSS || — || align=right | 2.7 km || 
|-id=646 bgcolor=#d6d6d6
| 383646 ||  || — || September 5, 2007 || Anderson Mesa || LONEOS || — || align=right | 2.9 km || 
|-id=647 bgcolor=#d6d6d6
| 383647 ||  || — || September 14, 2007 || Socorro || LINEAR || EOS || align=right | 2.3 km || 
|-id=648 bgcolor=#E9E9E9
| 383648 ||  || — || October 16, 1998 || Kitt Peak || Spacewatch || — || align=right | 2.5 km || 
|-id=649 bgcolor=#d6d6d6
| 383649 ||  || — || September 18, 2007 || Kitt Peak || Spacewatch || — || align=right | 3.1 km || 
|-id=650 bgcolor=#fefefe
| 383650 ||  || — || September 20, 2007 || Siding Spring || SSS || H || align=right | 1.1 km || 
|-id=651 bgcolor=#FA8072
| 383651 ||  || — || October 8, 2007 || Catalina || CSS || — || align=right data-sort-value="0.88" | 880 m || 
|-id=652 bgcolor=#d6d6d6
| 383652 ||  || — || October 4, 2007 || Catalina || CSS || THM || align=right | 2.6 km || 
|-id=653 bgcolor=#d6d6d6
| 383653 ||  || — || October 8, 2007 || Catalina || CSS || EOS || align=right | 2.7 km || 
|-id=654 bgcolor=#d6d6d6
| 383654 ||  || — || October 4, 2007 || Kitt Peak || Spacewatch || — || align=right | 3.6 km || 
|-id=655 bgcolor=#d6d6d6
| 383655 ||  || — || October 8, 2007 || Mount Lemmon || Mount Lemmon Survey || — || align=right | 2.1 km || 
|-id=656 bgcolor=#E9E9E9
| 383656 ||  || — || October 8, 2007 || Mount Lemmon || Mount Lemmon Survey || — || align=right | 2.4 km || 
|-id=657 bgcolor=#d6d6d6
| 383657 ||  || — || October 8, 2007 || Mount Lemmon || Mount Lemmon Survey || THM || align=right | 2.4 km || 
|-id=658 bgcolor=#d6d6d6
| 383658 ||  || — || October 7, 2007 || Catalina || CSS || — || align=right | 3.1 km || 
|-id=659 bgcolor=#d6d6d6
| 383659 ||  || — || September 5, 2007 || Catalina || CSS || — || align=right | 3.5 km || 
|-id=660 bgcolor=#d6d6d6
| 383660 ||  || — || October 6, 2007 || Kitt Peak || Spacewatch || — || align=right | 5.1 km || 
|-id=661 bgcolor=#d6d6d6
| 383661 ||  || — || October 7, 2007 || Mount Lemmon || Mount Lemmon Survey || EOS || align=right | 1.9 km || 
|-id=662 bgcolor=#d6d6d6
| 383662 ||  || — || October 8, 2007 || Catalina || CSS || — || align=right | 4.1 km || 
|-id=663 bgcolor=#d6d6d6
| 383663 ||  || — || October 9, 2007 || Catalina || CSS || TIR || align=right | 3.3 km || 
|-id=664 bgcolor=#d6d6d6
| 383664 ||  || — || October 9, 2007 || Kitt Peak || Spacewatch || EOS || align=right | 2.5 km || 
|-id=665 bgcolor=#d6d6d6
| 383665 ||  || — || September 15, 2007 || Anderson Mesa || LONEOS || — || align=right | 3.9 km || 
|-id=666 bgcolor=#d6d6d6
| 383666 ||  || — || October 9, 2007 || Socorro || LINEAR || — || align=right | 2.8 km || 
|-id=667 bgcolor=#d6d6d6
| 383667 ||  || — || October 12, 2007 || Socorro || LINEAR || — || align=right | 3.0 km || 
|-id=668 bgcolor=#E9E9E9
| 383668 ||  || — || September 10, 2007 || Mount Lemmon || Mount Lemmon Survey || — || align=right data-sort-value="0.95" | 950 m || 
|-id=669 bgcolor=#d6d6d6
| 383669 ||  || — || October 4, 2007 || Kitt Peak || Spacewatch || EOS || align=right | 2.1 km || 
|-id=670 bgcolor=#d6d6d6
| 383670 ||  || — || October 4, 2007 || Kitt Peak || Spacewatch || — || align=right | 3.0 km || 
|-id=671 bgcolor=#d6d6d6
| 383671 ||  || — || October 8, 2007 || Kitt Peak || Spacewatch || — || align=right | 2.0 km || 
|-id=672 bgcolor=#d6d6d6
| 383672 ||  || — || October 8, 2007 || Purple Mountain || PMO NEO || EOS || align=right | 2.7 km || 
|-id=673 bgcolor=#d6d6d6
| 383673 ||  || — || September 20, 2007 || Kitt Peak || Spacewatch || — || align=right | 3.5 km || 
|-id=674 bgcolor=#d6d6d6
| 383674 ||  || — || October 7, 2007 || Kitt Peak || Spacewatch || EOS || align=right | 1.9 km || 
|-id=675 bgcolor=#d6d6d6
| 383675 ||  || — || October 7, 2007 || Kitt Peak || Spacewatch || EOS || align=right | 2.5 km || 
|-id=676 bgcolor=#d6d6d6
| 383676 ||  || — || October 7, 2007 || Catalina || CSS || — || align=right | 3.7 km || 
|-id=677 bgcolor=#d6d6d6
| 383677 ||  || — || October 8, 2007 || Mount Lemmon || Mount Lemmon Survey || KOR || align=right | 1.4 km || 
|-id=678 bgcolor=#d6d6d6
| 383678 ||  || — || October 8, 2007 || Kitt Peak || Spacewatch || — || align=right | 3.9 km || 
|-id=679 bgcolor=#d6d6d6
| 383679 ||  || — || October 9, 2007 || Mount Lemmon || Mount Lemmon Survey || THM || align=right | 1.9 km || 
|-id=680 bgcolor=#d6d6d6
| 383680 ||  || — || October 5, 2007 || Siding Spring || SSS || — || align=right | 4.3 km || 
|-id=681 bgcolor=#d6d6d6
| 383681 ||  || — || October 8, 2007 || Catalina || CSS || — || align=right | 3.3 km || 
|-id=682 bgcolor=#d6d6d6
| 383682 ||  || — || October 8, 2007 || Catalina || CSS || — || align=right | 3.5 km || 
|-id=683 bgcolor=#d6d6d6
| 383683 ||  || — || October 11, 2007 || Mount Lemmon || Mount Lemmon Survey || EOS || align=right | 1.9 km || 
|-id=684 bgcolor=#d6d6d6
| 383684 ||  || — || October 10, 2007 || Kitt Peak || Spacewatch || VER || align=right | 3.3 km || 
|-id=685 bgcolor=#d6d6d6
| 383685 ||  || — || September 25, 2007 || Mount Lemmon || Mount Lemmon Survey || — || align=right | 3.3 km || 
|-id=686 bgcolor=#d6d6d6
| 383686 ||  || — || October 9, 2007 || Kitt Peak || Spacewatch || 637 || align=right | 2.9 km || 
|-id=687 bgcolor=#d6d6d6
| 383687 ||  || — || October 13, 2007 || Mount Lemmon || Mount Lemmon Survey || — || align=right | 2.5 km || 
|-id=688 bgcolor=#d6d6d6
| 383688 ||  || — || September 18, 1995 || Kitt Peak || Spacewatch || THM || align=right | 2.7 km || 
|-id=689 bgcolor=#d6d6d6
| 383689 ||  || — || October 12, 2007 || Kitt Peak || Spacewatch || — || align=right | 2.6 km || 
|-id=690 bgcolor=#d6d6d6
| 383690 ||  || — || October 10, 2007 || Mount Lemmon || Mount Lemmon Survey || HYG || align=right | 2.5 km || 
|-id=691 bgcolor=#d6d6d6
| 383691 ||  || — || May 16, 2005 || Kitt Peak || Spacewatch || EOS || align=right | 2.1 km || 
|-id=692 bgcolor=#d6d6d6
| 383692 ||  || — || October 14, 2007 || Mount Lemmon || Mount Lemmon Survey || — || align=right | 3.3 km || 
|-id=693 bgcolor=#d6d6d6
| 383693 ||  || — || October 14, 2007 || Kitt Peak || Spacewatch || — || align=right | 3.1 km || 
|-id=694 bgcolor=#d6d6d6
| 383694 ||  || — || October 14, 2007 || Kitt Peak || Spacewatch || THM || align=right | 2.3 km || 
|-id=695 bgcolor=#d6d6d6
| 383695 ||  || — || October 15, 2007 || Catalina || CSS || — || align=right | 2.8 km || 
|-id=696 bgcolor=#d6d6d6
| 383696 ||  || — || October 15, 2007 || Kitt Peak || Spacewatch || EOS || align=right | 2.1 km || 
|-id=697 bgcolor=#d6d6d6
| 383697 ||  || — || October 15, 2007 || Kitt Peak || Spacewatch || KOR || align=right | 1.2 km || 
|-id=698 bgcolor=#d6d6d6
| 383698 ||  || — || October 15, 2007 || Mount Lemmon || Mount Lemmon Survey || VER || align=right | 2.4 km || 
|-id=699 bgcolor=#d6d6d6
| 383699 ||  || — || October 14, 2007 || Catalina || CSS || — || align=right | 2.9 km || 
|-id=700 bgcolor=#d6d6d6
| 383700 ||  || — || September 13, 2007 || Catalina || CSS || — || align=right | 3.4 km || 
|}

383701–383800 

|-bgcolor=#d6d6d6
| 383701 ||  || — || October 9, 2007 || Kitt Peak || Spacewatch || — || align=right | 2.6 km || 
|-id=702 bgcolor=#d6d6d6
| 383702 ||  || — || September 4, 2007 || Catalina || CSS || BRAslow || align=right | 2.1 km || 
|-id=703 bgcolor=#d6d6d6
| 383703 ||  || — || October 10, 2007 || Catalina || CSS || LIX || align=right | 4.1 km || 
|-id=704 bgcolor=#d6d6d6
| 383704 ||  || — || October 8, 2007 || Catalina || CSS || — || align=right | 2.8 km || 
|-id=705 bgcolor=#d6d6d6
| 383705 ||  || — || October 10, 2007 || Kitt Peak || Spacewatch || EOS || align=right | 2.3 km || 
|-id=706 bgcolor=#fefefe
| 383706 ||  || — || September 13, 2007 || Catalina || CSS || H || align=right data-sort-value="0.89" | 890 m || 
|-id=707 bgcolor=#E9E9E9
| 383707 ||  || — || October 6, 2007 || Socorro || LINEAR || — || align=right | 2.9 km || 
|-id=708 bgcolor=#d6d6d6
| 383708 ||  || — || October 10, 2007 || Kitt Peak || Spacewatch || — || align=right | 3.2 km || 
|-id=709 bgcolor=#fefefe
| 383709 ||  || — || October 13, 2007 || Mount Lemmon || Mount Lemmon Survey || — || align=right data-sort-value="0.75" | 750 m || 
|-id=710 bgcolor=#d6d6d6
| 383710 || 2007 UB || — || October 16, 2007 || Mayhill || A. Lowe || — || align=right | 3.4 km || 
|-id=711 bgcolor=#d6d6d6
| 383711 ||  || — || October 10, 2007 || Kitt Peak || Spacewatch || — || align=right | 3.1 km || 
|-id=712 bgcolor=#d6d6d6
| 383712 ||  || — || October 16, 2007 || Catalina || CSS || THB || align=right | 2.4 km || 
|-id=713 bgcolor=#d6d6d6
| 383713 ||  || — || October 8, 2007 || Kitt Peak || Spacewatch || — || align=right | 3.1 km || 
|-id=714 bgcolor=#d6d6d6
| 383714 ||  || — || October 19, 2007 || Catalina || CSS || — || align=right | 2.8 km || 
|-id=715 bgcolor=#d6d6d6
| 383715 ||  || — || October 18, 2007 || Kitt Peak || Spacewatch || THM || align=right | 2.7 km || 
|-id=716 bgcolor=#d6d6d6
| 383716 ||  || — || October 19, 2007 || Catalina || CSS || — || align=right | 3.9 km || 
|-id=717 bgcolor=#d6d6d6
| 383717 ||  || — || March 10, 2005 || Mount Lemmon || Mount Lemmon Survey || THM || align=right | 2.6 km || 
|-id=718 bgcolor=#d6d6d6
| 383718 ||  || — || October 20, 2007 || Mount Lemmon || Mount Lemmon Survey || THM || align=right | 2.4 km || 
|-id=719 bgcolor=#d6d6d6
| 383719 ||  || — || September 10, 2007 || Mount Lemmon || Mount Lemmon Survey || — || align=right | 3.2 km || 
|-id=720 bgcolor=#d6d6d6
| 383720 ||  || — || October 31, 2007 || Mount Lemmon || Mount Lemmon Survey || — || align=right | 2.4 km || 
|-id=721 bgcolor=#d6d6d6
| 383721 ||  || — || October 31, 2007 || Mount Lemmon || Mount Lemmon Survey || — || align=right | 3.0 km || 
|-id=722 bgcolor=#d6d6d6
| 383722 ||  || — || October 30, 2007 || Mount Lemmon || Mount Lemmon Survey || THM || align=right | 2.1 km || 
|-id=723 bgcolor=#d6d6d6
| 383723 ||  || — || October 30, 2007 || Kitt Peak || Spacewatch || KOR || align=right | 1.5 km || 
|-id=724 bgcolor=#d6d6d6
| 383724 ||  || — || October 30, 2007 || Kitt Peak || Spacewatch || — || align=right | 3.4 km || 
|-id=725 bgcolor=#d6d6d6
| 383725 ||  || — || October 30, 2007 || Mount Lemmon || Mount Lemmon Survey || HYG || align=right | 2.5 km || 
|-id=726 bgcolor=#d6d6d6
| 383726 ||  || — || September 12, 2007 || Mount Lemmon || Mount Lemmon Survey || — || align=right | 2.6 km || 
|-id=727 bgcolor=#d6d6d6
| 383727 ||  || — || September 14, 2007 || Mount Lemmon || Mount Lemmon Survey || — || align=right | 3.1 km || 
|-id=728 bgcolor=#d6d6d6
| 383728 ||  || — || October 30, 2007 || Kitt Peak || Spacewatch || CRO || align=right | 3.8 km || 
|-id=729 bgcolor=#E9E9E9
| 383729 ||  || — || October 9, 2007 || Kitt Peak || Spacewatch || — || align=right | 1.9 km || 
|-id=730 bgcolor=#d6d6d6
| 383730 ||  || — || October 30, 2007 || Kitt Peak || Spacewatch || THM || align=right | 1.9 km || 
|-id=731 bgcolor=#d6d6d6
| 383731 ||  || — || October 21, 2007 || Mount Lemmon || Mount Lemmon Survey || HYG || align=right | 3.3 km || 
|-id=732 bgcolor=#d6d6d6
| 383732 ||  || — || October 16, 2007 || Catalina || CSS || — || align=right | 3.5 km || 
|-id=733 bgcolor=#d6d6d6
| 383733 ||  || — || October 16, 2007 || Mount Lemmon || Mount Lemmon Survey || — || align=right | 3.5 km || 
|-id=734 bgcolor=#d6d6d6
| 383734 ||  || — || January 5, 2003 || Socorro || LINEAR || — || align=right | 3.3 km || 
|-id=735 bgcolor=#d6d6d6
| 383735 ||  || — || November 1, 2007 || Kitt Peak || Spacewatch || EUP || align=right | 6.0 km || 
|-id=736 bgcolor=#d6d6d6
| 383736 ||  || — || November 1, 2007 || Kitt Peak || Spacewatch || — || align=right | 2.5 km || 
|-id=737 bgcolor=#d6d6d6
| 383737 ||  || — || November 1, 2007 || Kitt Peak || Spacewatch || VER || align=right | 3.5 km || 
|-id=738 bgcolor=#d6d6d6
| 383738 ||  || — || October 5, 2007 || Kitt Peak || Spacewatch || — || align=right | 4.0 km || 
|-id=739 bgcolor=#d6d6d6
| 383739 ||  || — || November 2, 2007 || Kitt Peak || Spacewatch || — || align=right | 4.7 km || 
|-id=740 bgcolor=#d6d6d6
| 383740 ||  || — || October 9, 2007 || Kitt Peak || Spacewatch || — || align=right | 2.7 km || 
|-id=741 bgcolor=#d6d6d6
| 383741 ||  || — || October 9, 2007 || Kitt Peak || Spacewatch || — || align=right | 3.7 km || 
|-id=742 bgcolor=#d6d6d6
| 383742 ||  || — || November 1, 2007 || Kitt Peak || Spacewatch || — || align=right | 2.8 km || 
|-id=743 bgcolor=#d6d6d6
| 383743 ||  || — || November 1, 2007 || Kitt Peak || Spacewatch || — || align=right | 2.7 km || 
|-id=744 bgcolor=#d6d6d6
| 383744 ||  || — || November 5, 2007 || XuYi || PMO NEO || — || align=right | 3.6 km || 
|-id=745 bgcolor=#d6d6d6
| 383745 ||  || — || November 4, 2007 || Socorro || LINEAR || EOS || align=right | 2.6 km || 
|-id=746 bgcolor=#d6d6d6
| 383746 ||  || — || November 3, 2007 || Socorro || LINEAR || — || align=right | 3.9 km || 
|-id=747 bgcolor=#d6d6d6
| 383747 ||  || — || November 8, 2007 || Socorro || LINEAR || — || align=right | 3.7 km || 
|-id=748 bgcolor=#d6d6d6
| 383748 ||  || — || November 1, 2007 || Kitt Peak || Spacewatch || — || align=right | 2.6 km || 
|-id=749 bgcolor=#d6d6d6
| 383749 ||  || — || November 3, 2007 || Kitt Peak || Spacewatch || — || align=right | 2.3 km || 
|-id=750 bgcolor=#d6d6d6
| 383750 ||  || — || November 4, 2007 || Mount Lemmon || Mount Lemmon Survey || — || align=right | 3.8 km || 
|-id=751 bgcolor=#d6d6d6
| 383751 ||  || — || November 4, 2007 || Catalina || CSS || — || align=right | 3.4 km || 
|-id=752 bgcolor=#d6d6d6
| 383752 ||  || — || November 5, 2007 || Kitt Peak || Spacewatch || HYG || align=right | 3.1 km || 
|-id=753 bgcolor=#d6d6d6
| 383753 ||  || — || November 4, 2007 || Kitt Peak || Spacewatch || — || align=right | 4.5 km || 
|-id=754 bgcolor=#d6d6d6
| 383754 ||  || — || November 4, 2007 || Kitt Peak || Spacewatch || LIX || align=right | 3.9 km || 
|-id=755 bgcolor=#d6d6d6
| 383755 ||  || — || November 5, 2007 || Kitt Peak || Spacewatch || EOS || align=right | 1.8 km || 
|-id=756 bgcolor=#d6d6d6
| 383756 ||  || — || November 12, 2007 || Bisei SG Center || BATTeRS || — || align=right | 4.1 km || 
|-id=757 bgcolor=#d6d6d6
| 383757 ||  || — || November 5, 2007 || Catalina || CSS || — || align=right | 3.4 km || 
|-id=758 bgcolor=#d6d6d6
| 383758 ||  || — || November 9, 2007 || Mount Lemmon || Mount Lemmon Survey || — || align=right | 2.1 km || 
|-id=759 bgcolor=#d6d6d6
| 383759 ||  || — || November 9, 2007 || Kitt Peak || Spacewatch || — || align=right | 2.2 km || 
|-id=760 bgcolor=#d6d6d6
| 383760 ||  || — || September 26, 2007 || Mount Lemmon || Mount Lemmon Survey || VER || align=right | 3.8 km || 
|-id=761 bgcolor=#d6d6d6
| 383761 ||  || — || November 12, 2007 || Catalina || CSS || — || align=right | 3.0 km || 
|-id=762 bgcolor=#d6d6d6
| 383762 ||  || — || November 12, 2007 || Mount Lemmon || Mount Lemmon Survey || LIX || align=right | 3.3 km || 
|-id=763 bgcolor=#d6d6d6
| 383763 ||  || — || October 16, 2007 || Mount Lemmon || Mount Lemmon Survey || EOS || align=right | 2.2 km || 
|-id=764 bgcolor=#d6d6d6
| 383764 ||  || — || November 7, 2007 || Catalina || CSS || EOS || align=right | 2.4 km || 
|-id=765 bgcolor=#d6d6d6
| 383765 ||  || — || November 8, 2007 || Kitt Peak || Spacewatch || THM || align=right | 2.1 km || 
|-id=766 bgcolor=#d6d6d6
| 383766 ||  || — || November 11, 2007 || Anderson Mesa || LONEOS || TIR || align=right | 2.8 km || 
|-id=767 bgcolor=#d6d6d6
| 383767 ||  || — || September 15, 2007 || Mount Lemmon || Mount Lemmon Survey || — || align=right | 2.5 km || 
|-id=768 bgcolor=#d6d6d6
| 383768 ||  || — || November 12, 2007 || Catalina || CSS || — || align=right | 3.5 km || 
|-id=769 bgcolor=#d6d6d6
| 383769 ||  || — || November 5, 2007 || XuYi || PMO NEO || — || align=right | 3.5 km || 
|-id=770 bgcolor=#d6d6d6
| 383770 ||  || — || November 15, 2007 || Mount Lemmon || Mount Lemmon Survey || — || align=right | 3.4 km || 
|-id=771 bgcolor=#d6d6d6
| 383771 ||  || — || November 12, 2007 || Mount Lemmon || Mount Lemmon Survey || EOS || align=right | 2.1 km || 
|-id=772 bgcolor=#d6d6d6
| 383772 ||  || — || November 12, 2007 || Mount Lemmon || Mount Lemmon Survey || — || align=right | 5.6 km || 
|-id=773 bgcolor=#d6d6d6
| 383773 ||  || — || November 11, 2007 || Catalina || CSS || — || align=right | 3.2 km || 
|-id=774 bgcolor=#d6d6d6
| 383774 ||  || — || November 12, 2007 || Catalina || CSS || TIR || align=right | 3.7 km || 
|-id=775 bgcolor=#d6d6d6
| 383775 ||  || — || November 15, 2007 || Catalina || CSS || — || align=right | 3.5 km || 
|-id=776 bgcolor=#d6d6d6
| 383776 ||  || — || November 2, 2007 || Catalina || CSS || — || align=right | 2.9 km || 
|-id=777 bgcolor=#d6d6d6
| 383777 ||  || — || November 12, 2007 || Mount Lemmon || Mount Lemmon Survey || EOS || align=right | 2.5 km || 
|-id=778 bgcolor=#d6d6d6
| 383778 ||  || — || November 8, 2007 || Catalina || CSS || — || align=right | 3.2 km || 
|-id=779 bgcolor=#d6d6d6
| 383779 ||  || — || October 15, 2007 || Mount Lemmon || Mount Lemmon Survey || — || align=right | 2.6 km || 
|-id=780 bgcolor=#d6d6d6
| 383780 ||  || — || October 14, 2007 || Catalina || CSS || — || align=right | 3.2 km || 
|-id=781 bgcolor=#d6d6d6
| 383781 ||  || — || November 2, 2007 || Socorro || LINEAR || — || align=right | 3.4 km || 
|-id=782 bgcolor=#d6d6d6
| 383782 ||  || — || November 2, 2007 || Purple Mountain || PMO NEO || — || align=right | 3.6 km || 
|-id=783 bgcolor=#d6d6d6
| 383783 ||  || — || November 3, 2007 || Mount Lemmon || Mount Lemmon Survey || — || align=right | 4.1 km || 
|-id=784 bgcolor=#d6d6d6
| 383784 ||  || — || November 8, 2007 || Mount Lemmon || Mount Lemmon Survey || — || align=right | 4.1 km || 
|-id=785 bgcolor=#d6d6d6
| 383785 ||  || — || October 17, 2007 || Mount Lemmon || Mount Lemmon Survey || — || align=right | 2.8 km || 
|-id=786 bgcolor=#d6d6d6
| 383786 ||  || — || November 18, 2007 || Socorro || LINEAR || — || align=right | 3.4 km || 
|-id=787 bgcolor=#d6d6d6
| 383787 ||  || — || November 17, 2007 || Mount Lemmon || Mount Lemmon Survey || — || align=right | 3.0 km || 
|-id=788 bgcolor=#d6d6d6
| 383788 ||  || — || November 18, 2007 || Catalina || CSS || EUP || align=right | 6.0 km || 
|-id=789 bgcolor=#d6d6d6
| 383789 ||  || — || November 18, 2007 || Mount Lemmon || Mount Lemmon Survey || — || align=right | 3.1 km || 
|-id=790 bgcolor=#d6d6d6
| 383790 ||  || — || November 18, 2007 || Mount Lemmon || Mount Lemmon Survey || EOS || align=right | 2.0 km || 
|-id=791 bgcolor=#d6d6d6
| 383791 ||  || — || November 17, 2007 || Mount Lemmon || Mount Lemmon Survey || — || align=right | 4.2 km || 
|-id=792 bgcolor=#d6d6d6
| 383792 ||  || — || November 18, 2007 || Mount Lemmon || Mount Lemmon Survey || — || align=right | 2.1 km || 
|-id=793 bgcolor=#d6d6d6
| 383793 ||  || — || November 18, 2007 || Mount Lemmon || Mount Lemmon Survey || EOS || align=right | 2.4 km || 
|-id=794 bgcolor=#d6d6d6
| 383794 ||  || — || November 20, 2007 || Mount Lemmon || Mount Lemmon Survey || — || align=right | 3.1 km || 
|-id=795 bgcolor=#d6d6d6
| 383795 ||  || — || November 20, 2007 || Mount Lemmon || Mount Lemmon Survey || — || align=right | 3.7 km || 
|-id=796 bgcolor=#d6d6d6
| 383796 ||  || — || November 20, 2007 || Mount Lemmon || Mount Lemmon Survey || — || align=right | 3.2 km || 
|-id=797 bgcolor=#d6d6d6
| 383797 || 2007 XX || — || December 3, 2007 || Kanab || E. E. Sheridan || — || align=right | 2.7 km || 
|-id=798 bgcolor=#d6d6d6
| 383798 ||  || — || December 4, 2007 || Kitt Peak || Spacewatch || EOS || align=right | 3.4 km || 
|-id=799 bgcolor=#d6d6d6
| 383799 ||  || — || November 2, 2007 || Socorro || LINEAR || — || align=right | 5.1 km || 
|-id=800 bgcolor=#fefefe
| 383800 ||  || — || December 16, 2007 || Kitt Peak || Spacewatch || — || align=right data-sort-value="0.57" | 570 m || 
|}

383801–383900 

|-bgcolor=#d6d6d6
| 383801 ||  || — || December 5, 2007 || Kitt Peak || Spacewatch || — || align=right | 4.5 km || 
|-id=802 bgcolor=#d6d6d6
| 383802 ||  || — || December 28, 2007 || Kitt Peak || Spacewatch || EOS || align=right | 3.7 km || 
|-id=803 bgcolor=#d6d6d6
| 383803 ||  || — || November 3, 2007 || Mount Lemmon || Mount Lemmon Survey || — || align=right | 3.0 km || 
|-id=804 bgcolor=#d6d6d6
| 383804 ||  || — || December 30, 2007 || Catalina || CSS || — || align=right | 2.8 km || 
|-id=805 bgcolor=#fefefe
| 383805 ||  || — || December 31, 2007 || Kitt Peak || Spacewatch || — || align=right data-sort-value="0.64" | 640 m || 
|-id=806 bgcolor=#d6d6d6
| 383806 ||  || — || December 30, 2007 || Kitt Peak || Spacewatch || — || align=right | 3.7 km || 
|-id=807 bgcolor=#d6d6d6
| 383807 ||  || — || December 30, 2007 || Kitt Peak || Spacewatch || — || align=right | 2.5 km || 
|-id=808 bgcolor=#d6d6d6
| 383808 ||  || — || December 18, 2007 || Mount Lemmon || Mount Lemmon Survey || — || align=right | 3.4 km || 
|-id=809 bgcolor=#d6d6d6
| 383809 ||  || — || January 10, 2008 || Mount Lemmon || Mount Lemmon Survey || HYG || align=right | 3.1 km || 
|-id=810 bgcolor=#d6d6d6
| 383810 ||  || — || October 16, 2007 || Mount Lemmon || Mount Lemmon Survey || — || align=right | 3.1 km || 
|-id=811 bgcolor=#d6d6d6
| 383811 ||  || — || January 10, 2008 || Kitt Peak || Spacewatch || 7:4 || align=right | 5.3 km || 
|-id=812 bgcolor=#d6d6d6
| 383812 ||  || — || January 13, 2008 || Mount Lemmon || Mount Lemmon Survey || THB || align=right | 3.5 km || 
|-id=813 bgcolor=#d6d6d6
| 383813 ||  || — || January 14, 2008 || Kitt Peak || Spacewatch || ALA || align=right | 4.9 km || 
|-id=814 bgcolor=#d6d6d6
| 383814 ||  || — || December 17, 2007 || Mount Lemmon || Mount Lemmon Survey || — || align=right | 3.4 km || 
|-id=815 bgcolor=#d6d6d6
| 383815 ||  || — || January 16, 2008 || Kitt Peak || Spacewatch || 7:4 || align=right | 5.1 km || 
|-id=816 bgcolor=#fefefe
| 383816 ||  || — || February 2, 2008 || Kitt Peak || Spacewatch || FLO || align=right data-sort-value="0.58" | 580 m || 
|-id=817 bgcolor=#fefefe
| 383817 ||  || — || February 9, 2008 || Saint-Sulpice || B. Christophe || FLO || align=right data-sort-value="0.63" | 630 m || 
|-id=818 bgcolor=#fefefe
| 383818 ||  || — || February 9, 2008 || Mount Lemmon || Mount Lemmon Survey || — || align=right data-sort-value="0.84" | 840 m || 
|-id=819 bgcolor=#d6d6d6
| 383819 ||  || — || January 19, 2008 || Mount Lemmon || Mount Lemmon Survey || — || align=right | 3.0 km || 
|-id=820 bgcolor=#fefefe
| 383820 ||  || — || February 27, 2008 || Kitt Peak || Spacewatch || — || align=right data-sort-value="0.68" | 680 m || 
|-id=821 bgcolor=#fefefe
| 383821 ||  || — || January 11, 2008 || Mount Lemmon || Mount Lemmon Survey || — || align=right data-sort-value="0.59" | 590 m || 
|-id=822 bgcolor=#fefefe
| 383822 ||  || — || February 28, 2008 || Mount Lemmon || Mount Lemmon Survey || V || align=right data-sort-value="0.68" | 680 m || 
|-id=823 bgcolor=#fefefe
| 383823 ||  || — || March 1, 2008 || Kitt Peak || Spacewatch || — || align=right data-sort-value="0.57" | 570 m || 
|-id=824 bgcolor=#fefefe
| 383824 ||  || — || March 4, 2008 || Kitt Peak || Spacewatch || — || align=right data-sort-value="0.73" | 730 m || 
|-id=825 bgcolor=#fefefe
| 383825 ||  || — || February 14, 2008 || Mount Lemmon || Mount Lemmon Survey || — || align=right data-sort-value="0.94" | 940 m || 
|-id=826 bgcolor=#fefefe
| 383826 ||  || — || February 12, 2008 || Mount Lemmon || Mount Lemmon Survey || — || align=right data-sort-value="0.82" | 820 m || 
|-id=827 bgcolor=#fefefe
| 383827 ||  || — || March 13, 2008 || Kitt Peak || Spacewatch || FLO || align=right data-sort-value="0.61" | 610 m || 
|-id=828 bgcolor=#fefefe
| 383828 ||  || — || March 28, 2008 || Kitt Peak || Spacewatch || — || align=right | 1.0 km || 
|-id=829 bgcolor=#fefefe
| 383829 ||  || — || March 28, 2008 || Mount Lemmon || Mount Lemmon Survey || NYS || align=right data-sort-value="0.63" | 630 m || 
|-id=830 bgcolor=#fefefe
| 383830 ||  || — || March 28, 2008 || Kitt Peak || Spacewatch || NYS || align=right data-sort-value="0.81" | 810 m || 
|-id=831 bgcolor=#fefefe
| 383831 ||  || — || February 13, 2008 || Mount Lemmon || Mount Lemmon Survey || — || align=right data-sort-value="0.67" | 670 m || 
|-id=832 bgcolor=#fefefe
| 383832 ||  || — || March 28, 2008 || Kitt Peak || Spacewatch || — || align=right data-sort-value="0.68" | 680 m || 
|-id=833 bgcolor=#fefefe
| 383833 ||  || — || March 30, 2008 || Kitt Peak || Spacewatch || — || align=right data-sort-value="0.91" | 910 m || 
|-id=834 bgcolor=#fefefe
| 383834 ||  || — || March 30, 2008 || Kitt Peak || Spacewatch || FLO || align=right data-sort-value="0.65" | 650 m || 
|-id=835 bgcolor=#d6d6d6
| 383835 ||  || — || March 16, 2008 || Kitt Peak || Spacewatch || 3:2 || align=right | 4.4 km || 
|-id=836 bgcolor=#fefefe
| 383836 ||  || — || April 6, 2008 || Kitt Peak || Spacewatch || FLO || align=right data-sort-value="0.67" | 670 m || 
|-id=837 bgcolor=#fefefe
| 383837 ||  || — || April 7, 2008 || Kitt Peak || Spacewatch || FLO || align=right data-sort-value="0.70" | 700 m || 
|-id=838 bgcolor=#fefefe
| 383838 ||  || — || April 9, 2008 || Kitt Peak || Spacewatch || NYS || align=right data-sort-value="0.69" | 690 m || 
|-id=839 bgcolor=#fefefe
| 383839 ||  || — || April 10, 2008 || Kitt Peak || Spacewatch || — || align=right data-sort-value="0.91" | 910 m || 
|-id=840 bgcolor=#fefefe
| 383840 ||  || — || March 11, 2008 || Kitt Peak || Spacewatch || — || align=right data-sort-value="0.81" | 810 m || 
|-id=841 bgcolor=#fefefe
| 383841 ||  || — || April 15, 2008 || Mount Lemmon || Mount Lemmon Survey || — || align=right data-sort-value="0.78" | 780 m || 
|-id=842 bgcolor=#fefefe
| 383842 ||  || — || January 30, 2008 || Mount Lemmon || Mount Lemmon Survey || PHO || align=right | 1.5 km || 
|-id=843 bgcolor=#fefefe
| 383843 ||  || — || May 4, 2008 || Kitt Peak || Spacewatch || FLO || align=right data-sort-value="0.80" | 800 m || 
|-id=844 bgcolor=#fefefe
| 383844 ||  || — || May 7, 2008 || Skylive Obs. || F. Tozzi || PHO || align=right | 1.4 km || 
|-id=845 bgcolor=#fefefe
| 383845 ||  || — || October 1, 2005 || Mount Lemmon || Mount Lemmon Survey || NYS || align=right | 2.4 km || 
|-id=846 bgcolor=#fefefe
| 383846 ||  || — || April 15, 2008 || Catalina || CSS || PHO || align=right | 1.3 km || 
|-id=847 bgcolor=#fefefe
| 383847 ||  || — || May 4, 2008 || Kitt Peak || Spacewatch || — || align=right | 1.0 km || 
|-id=848 bgcolor=#fefefe
| 383848 ||  || — || May 29, 2008 || Mount Lemmon || Mount Lemmon Survey || — || align=right data-sort-value="0.84" | 840 m || 
|-id=849 bgcolor=#fefefe
| 383849 ||  || — || June 3, 2008 || Mount Lemmon || Mount Lemmon Survey || — || align=right data-sort-value="0.72" | 720 m || 
|-id=850 bgcolor=#E9E9E9
| 383850 ||  || — || June 16, 2008 || Catalina || CSS || — || align=right | 2.0 km || 
|-id=851 bgcolor=#E9E9E9
| 383851 ||  || — || July 25, 2008 || Siding Spring || SSS || — || align=right | 1.1 km || 
|-id=852 bgcolor=#fefefe
| 383852 ||  || — || July 30, 2008 || Kitt Peak || Spacewatch || — || align=right data-sort-value="0.92" | 920 m || 
|-id=853 bgcolor=#E9E9E9
| 383853 ||  || — || July 28, 2008 || Catalina || CSS || — || align=right | 2.0 km || 
|-id=854 bgcolor=#E9E9E9
| 383854 ||  || — || August 3, 2008 || La Sagra || OAM Obs. || — || align=right | 1.4 km || 
|-id=855 bgcolor=#E9E9E9
| 383855 ||  || — || August 1, 2008 || La Sagra || OAM Obs. || — || align=right | 1.5 km || 
|-id=856 bgcolor=#E9E9E9
| 383856 ||  || — || August 10, 2008 || Črni Vrh || Črni Vrh || — || align=right | 2.6 km || 
|-id=857 bgcolor=#E9E9E9
| 383857 ||  || — || August 10, 2008 || Dauban || F. Kugel || — || align=right | 2.3 km || 
|-id=858 bgcolor=#E9E9E9
| 383858 ||  || — || August 5, 2008 || Siding Spring || SSS || JUN || align=right | 1.1 km || 
|-id=859 bgcolor=#fefefe
| 383859 ||  || — || January 27, 2003 || Anderson Mesa || LONEOS || FLO || align=right data-sort-value="0.77" | 770 m || 
|-id=860 bgcolor=#E9E9E9
| 383860 ||  || — || August 24, 2008 || Altschwendt || W. Ries || EUN || align=right | 1.4 km || 
|-id=861 bgcolor=#E9E9E9
| 383861 ||  || — || August 6, 2008 || Siding Spring || SSS || BAR || align=right | 1.6 km || 
|-id=862 bgcolor=#E9E9E9
| 383862 ||  || — || August 30, 2008 || Dauban || F. Kugel || — || align=right data-sort-value="0.99" | 990 m || 
|-id=863 bgcolor=#E9E9E9
| 383863 ||  || — || August 24, 2008 || La Sagra || OAM Obs. || — || align=right data-sort-value="0.99" | 990 m || 
|-id=864 bgcolor=#E9E9E9
| 383864 ||  || — || August 23, 2008 || Siding Spring || SSS || — || align=right | 2.0 km || 
|-id=865 bgcolor=#E9E9E9
| 383865 ||  || — || August 26, 2008 || Socorro || LINEAR || — || align=right | 2.3 km || 
|-id=866 bgcolor=#E9E9E9
| 383866 ||  || — || August 30, 2008 || Socorro || LINEAR || INO || align=right | 1.8 km || 
|-id=867 bgcolor=#E9E9E9
| 383867 ||  || — || August 30, 2008 || Socorro || LINEAR || — || align=right | 2.2 km || 
|-id=868 bgcolor=#E9E9E9
| 383868 ||  || — || September 5, 2008 || Goodricke-Pigott || R. A. Tucker || — || align=right | 1.2 km || 
|-id=869 bgcolor=#E9E9E9
| 383869 ||  || — || September 2, 2008 || Dauban || F. Kugel || JUN || align=right | 1.1 km || 
|-id=870 bgcolor=#E9E9E9
| 383870 ||  || — || September 2, 2008 || Kitt Peak || Spacewatch || WIT || align=right | 1.0 km || 
|-id=871 bgcolor=#E9E9E9
| 383871 ||  || — || September 2, 2008 || Kitt Peak || Spacewatch || — || align=right | 1.5 km || 
|-id=872 bgcolor=#E9E9E9
| 383872 ||  || — || February 7, 2006 || Catalina || CSS || RAF || align=right | 1.1 km || 
|-id=873 bgcolor=#E9E9E9
| 383873 ||  || — || September 3, 2008 || Kitt Peak || Spacewatch || — || align=right | 1.6 km || 
|-id=874 bgcolor=#E9E9E9
| 383874 ||  || — || September 4, 2008 || Kitt Peak || Spacewatch || — || align=right data-sort-value="0.88" | 880 m || 
|-id=875 bgcolor=#E9E9E9
| 383875 ||  || — || September 4, 2008 || Kitt Peak || Spacewatch || — || align=right | 1.6 km || 
|-id=876 bgcolor=#E9E9E9
| 383876 ||  || — || September 6, 2008 || Catalina || CSS || — || align=right | 2.8 km || 
|-id=877 bgcolor=#E9E9E9
| 383877 ||  || — || September 7, 2008 || Mount Lemmon || Mount Lemmon Survey || — || align=right | 1.6 km || 
|-id=878 bgcolor=#E9E9E9
| 383878 ||  || — || September 5, 2008 || Kitt Peak || Spacewatch || HOF || align=right | 2.4 km || 
|-id=879 bgcolor=#E9E9E9
| 383879 ||  || — || September 9, 2008 || Kitt Peak || Spacewatch || — || align=right | 2.1 km || 
|-id=880 bgcolor=#E9E9E9
| 383880 ||  || — || September 10, 2008 || Kitt Peak || Spacewatch || PAD || align=right | 1.8 km || 
|-id=881 bgcolor=#E9E9E9
| 383881 ||  || — || September 7, 2008 || Mount Lemmon || Mount Lemmon Survey || — || align=right | 1.2 km || 
|-id=882 bgcolor=#E9E9E9
| 383882 ||  || — || September 9, 2008 || Mount Lemmon || Mount Lemmon Survey || — || align=right | 2.5 km || 
|-id=883 bgcolor=#E9E9E9
| 383883 ||  || — || September 4, 2008 || Kitt Peak || Spacewatch || — || align=right | 2.6 km || 
|-id=884 bgcolor=#E9E9E9
| 383884 ||  || — || September 5, 2008 || Kitt Peak || Spacewatch || — || align=right | 2.5 km || 
|-id=885 bgcolor=#E9E9E9
| 383885 ||  || — || September 7, 2008 || Mount Lemmon || Mount Lemmon Survey || — || align=right | 1.4 km || 
|-id=886 bgcolor=#E9E9E9
| 383886 ||  || — || September 9, 2008 || Catalina || CSS || — || align=right | 1.3 km || 
|-id=887 bgcolor=#E9E9E9
| 383887 ||  || — || September 7, 2008 || Socorro || LINEAR || — || align=right | 2.4 km || 
|-id=888 bgcolor=#E9E9E9
| 383888 ||  || — || September 5, 2008 || Socorro || LINEAR || DOR || align=right | 3.4 km || 
|-id=889 bgcolor=#E9E9E9
| 383889 ||  || — || September 21, 2008 || Grove Creek || F. Tozzi || CLO || align=right | 2.7 km || 
|-id=890 bgcolor=#E9E9E9
| 383890 ||  || — || August 22, 2008 || Kitt Peak || Spacewatch || JUN || align=right | 1.3 km || 
|-id=891 bgcolor=#E9E9E9
| 383891 ||  || — || September 22, 2008 || Socorro || LINEAR || — || align=right | 2.5 km || 
|-id=892 bgcolor=#E9E9E9
| 383892 ||  || — || September 22, 2008 || Socorro || LINEAR || — || align=right | 1.1 km || 
|-id=893 bgcolor=#E9E9E9
| 383893 ||  || — || September 4, 2008 || Kitt Peak || Spacewatch || — || align=right | 1.6 km || 
|-id=894 bgcolor=#d6d6d6
| 383894 ||  || — || September 20, 2008 || Kitt Peak || Spacewatch || FIR || align=right | 4.4 km || 
|-id=895 bgcolor=#E9E9E9
| 383895 ||  || — || September 20, 2008 || Kitt Peak || Spacewatch || — || align=right | 2.7 km || 
|-id=896 bgcolor=#E9E9E9
| 383896 ||  || — || September 20, 2008 || Catalina || CSS || — || align=right | 2.5 km || 
|-id=897 bgcolor=#E9E9E9
| 383897 ||  || — || September 20, 2008 || Kitt Peak || Spacewatch || — || align=right | 2.0 km || 
|-id=898 bgcolor=#E9E9E9
| 383898 ||  || — || September 20, 2008 || Kitt Peak || Spacewatch || — || align=right | 2.0 km || 
|-id=899 bgcolor=#E9E9E9
| 383899 ||  || — || September 20, 2008 || Kitt Peak || Spacewatch || — || align=right | 1.4 km || 
|-id=900 bgcolor=#E9E9E9
| 383900 ||  || — || September 20, 2008 || Mount Lemmon || Mount Lemmon Survey || — || align=right | 1.9 km || 
|}

383901–384000 

|-bgcolor=#E9E9E9
| 383901 ||  || — || September 20, 2008 || Mount Lemmon || Mount Lemmon Survey || — || align=right | 1.6 km || 
|-id=902 bgcolor=#E9E9E9
| 383902 ||  || — || September 20, 2008 || Kitt Peak || Spacewatch || AEO || align=right | 1.1 km || 
|-id=903 bgcolor=#E9E9E9
| 383903 ||  || — || September 21, 2008 || Catalina || CSS || — || align=right | 1.5 km || 
|-id=904 bgcolor=#d6d6d6
| 383904 ||  || — || September 4, 2008 || Kitt Peak || Spacewatch || — || align=right | 3.5 km || 
|-id=905 bgcolor=#E9E9E9
| 383905 ||  || — || September 22, 2008 || Kitt Peak || Spacewatch || — || align=right | 1.2 km || 
|-id=906 bgcolor=#E9E9E9
| 383906 ||  || — || September 23, 2008 || Mount Lemmon || Mount Lemmon Survey || — || align=right | 1.5 km || 
|-id=907 bgcolor=#E9E9E9
| 383907 ||  || — || September 23, 2008 || Mount Lemmon || Mount Lemmon Survey || — || align=right | 2.1 km || 
|-id=908 bgcolor=#E9E9E9
| 383908 ||  || — || September 25, 2008 || Dauban || F. Kugel || — || align=right | 2.2 km || 
|-id=909 bgcolor=#E9E9E9
| 383909 ||  || — || September 20, 2008 || Catalina || CSS || — || align=right | 1.1 km || 
|-id=910 bgcolor=#E9E9E9
| 383910 ||  || — || September 9, 2008 || Mount Lemmon || Mount Lemmon Survey || — || align=right | 1.5 km || 
|-id=911 bgcolor=#E9E9E9
| 383911 ||  || — || September 21, 2008 || Kitt Peak || Spacewatch || — || align=right | 1.5 km || 
|-id=912 bgcolor=#E9E9E9
| 383912 ||  || — || September 22, 2008 || Kitt Peak || Spacewatch || — || align=right | 2.0 km || 
|-id=913 bgcolor=#E9E9E9
| 383913 ||  || — || September 22, 2008 || Mount Lemmon || Mount Lemmon Survey || — || align=right | 1.4 km || 
|-id=914 bgcolor=#E9E9E9
| 383914 ||  || — || September 22, 2008 || Mount Lemmon || Mount Lemmon Survey || AGN || align=right | 1.2 km || 
|-id=915 bgcolor=#E9E9E9
| 383915 ||  || — || September 22, 2008 || Mount Lemmon || Mount Lemmon Survey || — || align=right | 2.5 km || 
|-id=916 bgcolor=#d6d6d6
| 383916 ||  || — || September 22, 2008 || Kitt Peak || Spacewatch || — || align=right | 3.6 km || 
|-id=917 bgcolor=#E9E9E9
| 383917 ||  || — || September 22, 2008 || Kitt Peak || Spacewatch || WIT || align=right | 1.0 km || 
|-id=918 bgcolor=#E9E9E9
| 383918 ||  || — || September 22, 2008 || Kitt Peak || Spacewatch || HOF || align=right | 3.0 km || 
|-id=919 bgcolor=#E9E9E9
| 383919 ||  || — || September 22, 2008 || Goodricke-Pigott || R. A. Tucker || — || align=right | 2.8 km || 
|-id=920 bgcolor=#E9E9E9
| 383920 ||  || — || September 24, 2008 || Bergisch Gladbac || W. Bickel || — || align=right | 2.5 km || 
|-id=921 bgcolor=#E9E9E9
| 383921 ||  || — || September 24, 2008 || Mount Lemmon || Mount Lemmon Survey || HNS || align=right | 1.7 km || 
|-id=922 bgcolor=#E9E9E9
| 383922 ||  || — || September 28, 2008 || Socorro || LINEAR || — || align=right | 1.6 km || 
|-id=923 bgcolor=#E9E9E9
| 383923 ||  || — || September 28, 2008 || Socorro || LINEAR || — || align=right | 1.3 km || 
|-id=924 bgcolor=#E9E9E9
| 383924 ||  || — || September 28, 2008 || Socorro || LINEAR || — || align=right | 1.8 km || 
|-id=925 bgcolor=#E9E9E9
| 383925 ||  || — || September 22, 2008 || Catalina || CSS || BRG || align=right | 1.4 km || 
|-id=926 bgcolor=#E9E9E9
| 383926 ||  || — || September 22, 2008 || Catalina || CSS || — || align=right | 2.0 km || 
|-id=927 bgcolor=#E9E9E9
| 383927 ||  || — || December 27, 2000 || Kitt Peak || Spacewatch || — || align=right | 1.7 km || 
|-id=928 bgcolor=#E9E9E9
| 383928 ||  || — || September 25, 2008 || Kitt Peak || Spacewatch || — || align=right | 1.4 km || 
|-id=929 bgcolor=#E9E9E9
| 383929 ||  || — || September 25, 2008 || Kitt Peak || Spacewatch || HEN || align=right | 1.0 km || 
|-id=930 bgcolor=#E9E9E9
| 383930 ||  || — || September 25, 2008 || Kitt Peak || Spacewatch || — || align=right | 1.6 km || 
|-id=931 bgcolor=#E9E9E9
| 383931 ||  || — || September 26, 2008 || Kitt Peak || Spacewatch || GEF || align=right | 1.1 km || 
|-id=932 bgcolor=#E9E9E9
| 383932 ||  || — || September 26, 2008 || Kitt Peak || Spacewatch || — || align=right | 1.9 km || 
|-id=933 bgcolor=#E9E9E9
| 383933 ||  || — || September 26, 2008 || Kitt Peak || Spacewatch || AGN || align=right | 1.2 km || 
|-id=934 bgcolor=#E9E9E9
| 383934 ||  || — || September 26, 2008 || Kitt Peak || Spacewatch || — || align=right | 1.9 km || 
|-id=935 bgcolor=#E9E9E9
| 383935 ||  || — || September 30, 2008 || Kitt Peak || Spacewatch || — || align=right | 1.7 km || 
|-id=936 bgcolor=#E9E9E9
| 383936 ||  || — || November 1, 1999 || Kitt Peak || Spacewatch || NEM || align=right | 2.5 km || 
|-id=937 bgcolor=#E9E9E9
| 383937 ||  || — || September 25, 2008 || Mount Lemmon || Mount Lemmon Survey || — || align=right | 1.1 km || 
|-id=938 bgcolor=#E9E9E9
| 383938 ||  || — || December 15, 2004 || Kitt Peak || Spacewatch || NEM || align=right | 2.1 km || 
|-id=939 bgcolor=#E9E9E9
| 383939 ||  || — || September 21, 2008 || Kitt Peak || Spacewatch || — || align=right | 1.2 km || 
|-id=940 bgcolor=#E9E9E9
| 383940 ||  || — || September 29, 2008 || Kitt Peak || Spacewatch || — || align=right | 1.6 km || 
|-id=941 bgcolor=#E9E9E9
| 383941 ||  || — || September 26, 2008 || Kitt Peak || Spacewatch || — || align=right | 3.0 km || 
|-id=942 bgcolor=#E9E9E9
| 383942 ||  || — || September 23, 2008 || Catalina || CSS || — || align=right | 1.9 km || 
|-id=943 bgcolor=#E9E9E9
| 383943 ||  || — || September 23, 2008 || Catalina || CSS || — || align=right | 3.0 km || 
|-id=944 bgcolor=#E9E9E9
| 383944 ||  || — || September 24, 2008 || Mount Lemmon || Mount Lemmon Survey || HOF || align=right | 3.4 km || 
|-id=945 bgcolor=#E9E9E9
| 383945 ||  || — || September 29, 2008 || Catalina || CSS || — || align=right | 1.8 km || 
|-id=946 bgcolor=#E9E9E9
| 383946 ||  || — || September 29, 2008 || Catalina || CSS || — || align=right | 2.6 km || 
|-id=947 bgcolor=#E9E9E9
| 383947 ||  || — || September 30, 2008 || Mount Lemmon || Mount Lemmon Survey || — || align=right | 2.0 km || 
|-id=948 bgcolor=#E9E9E9
| 383948 ||  || — || September 19, 2008 || Kitt Peak || Spacewatch || — || align=right | 2.6 km || 
|-id=949 bgcolor=#E9E9E9
| 383949 ||  || — || September 29, 2008 || Mount Lemmon || Mount Lemmon Survey || AGN || align=right | 1.3 km || 
|-id=950 bgcolor=#E9E9E9
| 383950 ||  || — || September 22, 2008 || Kitt Peak || Spacewatch || VIB || align=right | 1.9 km || 
|-id=951 bgcolor=#E9E9E9
| 383951 ||  || — || September 28, 2008 || Mount Lemmon || Mount Lemmon Survey || — || align=right | 2.1 km || 
|-id=952 bgcolor=#E9E9E9
| 383952 ||  || — || September 29, 2008 || Mount Lemmon || Mount Lemmon Survey || — || align=right | 2.8 km || 
|-id=953 bgcolor=#E9E9E9
| 383953 || 2008 TV || — || October 2, 2008 || Great Shefford || P. Birtwhistle || MRX || align=right | 1.0 km || 
|-id=954 bgcolor=#E9E9E9
| 383954 ||  || — || October 1, 2008 || Antares || ARO || — || align=right | 1.8 km || 
|-id=955 bgcolor=#E9E9E9
| 383955 ||  || — || September 22, 2008 || Mount Lemmon || Mount Lemmon Survey || — || align=right | 1.5 km || 
|-id=956 bgcolor=#E9E9E9
| 383956 ||  || — || October 3, 2008 || La Sagra || OAM Obs. || AEO || align=right | 1.2 km || 
|-id=957 bgcolor=#E9E9E9
| 383957 ||  || — || October 4, 2008 || La Sagra || OAM Obs. || GEF || align=right | 2.9 km || 
|-id=958 bgcolor=#E9E9E9
| 383958 ||  || — || October 1, 2008 || Kitt Peak || Spacewatch || — || align=right | 1.8 km || 
|-id=959 bgcolor=#E9E9E9
| 383959 ||  || — || October 1, 2008 || Kitt Peak || Spacewatch || — || align=right | 1.3 km || 
|-id=960 bgcolor=#E9E9E9
| 383960 ||  || — || October 1, 2008 || Kitt Peak || Spacewatch || — || align=right | 1.8 km || 
|-id=961 bgcolor=#E9E9E9
| 383961 ||  || — || October 1, 2008 || Mount Lemmon || Mount Lemmon Survey || — || align=right | 1.4 km || 
|-id=962 bgcolor=#E9E9E9
| 383962 ||  || — || October 1, 2008 || Kitt Peak || Spacewatch || — || align=right | 1.00 km || 
|-id=963 bgcolor=#E9E9E9
| 383963 ||  || — || October 1, 2008 || Mount Lemmon || Mount Lemmon Survey || — || align=right | 3.1 km || 
|-id=964 bgcolor=#E9E9E9
| 383964 ||  || — || October 1, 2008 || Mount Lemmon || Mount Lemmon Survey || — || align=right | 1.2 km || 
|-id=965 bgcolor=#E9E9E9
| 383965 ||  || — || October 1, 2008 || Kitt Peak || Spacewatch || — || align=right | 1.8 km || 
|-id=966 bgcolor=#E9E9E9
| 383966 ||  || — || October 2, 2008 || Kitt Peak || Spacewatch || — || align=right | 1.6 km || 
|-id=967 bgcolor=#E9E9E9
| 383967 ||  || — || October 2, 2008 || Kitt Peak || Spacewatch || — || align=right | 1.4 km || 
|-id=968 bgcolor=#E9E9E9
| 383968 ||  || — || October 2, 2008 || Kitt Peak || Spacewatch || — || align=right | 1.5 km || 
|-id=969 bgcolor=#E9E9E9
| 383969 ||  || — || October 2, 2008 || Kitt Peak || Spacewatch || WIT || align=right | 1.2 km || 
|-id=970 bgcolor=#E9E9E9
| 383970 ||  || — || October 2, 2008 || Kitt Peak || Spacewatch || — || align=right | 1.1 km || 
|-id=971 bgcolor=#E9E9E9
| 383971 ||  || — || October 2, 2008 || Kitt Peak || Spacewatch || — || align=right | 1.8 km || 
|-id=972 bgcolor=#E9E9E9
| 383972 ||  || — || October 3, 2008 || Kitt Peak || Spacewatch || — || align=right | 2.4 km || 
|-id=973 bgcolor=#E9E9E9
| 383973 ||  || — || October 3, 2008 || Kitt Peak || Spacewatch || AGN || align=right | 1.2 km || 
|-id=974 bgcolor=#E9E9E9
| 383974 ||  || — || September 23, 2008 || Catalina || CSS || HNS || align=right | 1.5 km || 
|-id=975 bgcolor=#E9E9E9
| 383975 ||  || — || September 24, 2008 || Kitt Peak || Spacewatch || — || align=right | 1.5 km || 
|-id=976 bgcolor=#E9E9E9
| 383976 ||  || — || October 6, 2008 || Kitt Peak || Spacewatch || — || align=right | 1.2 km || 
|-id=977 bgcolor=#E9E9E9
| 383977 ||  || — || October 6, 2008 || Kitt Peak || Spacewatch || — || align=right | 1.3 km || 
|-id=978 bgcolor=#E9E9E9
| 383978 ||  || — || October 6, 2008 || Kitt Peak || Spacewatch || — || align=right | 1.2 km || 
|-id=979 bgcolor=#E9E9E9
| 383979 ||  || — || September 20, 2008 || Kitt Peak || Spacewatch || — || align=right | 1.4 km || 
|-id=980 bgcolor=#E9E9E9
| 383980 ||  || — || October 6, 2008 || Catalina || CSS || — || align=right | 3.3 km || 
|-id=981 bgcolor=#E9E9E9
| 383981 ||  || — || October 6, 2008 || Catalina || CSS || — || align=right | 1.8 km || 
|-id=982 bgcolor=#E9E9E9
| 383982 ||  || — || October 6, 2008 || Catalina || CSS || — || align=right | 1.8 km || 
|-id=983 bgcolor=#E9E9E9
| 383983 ||  || — || October 7, 2008 || Catalina || CSS || — || align=right | 1.5 km || 
|-id=984 bgcolor=#d6d6d6
| 383984 ||  || — || October 7, 2008 || Catalina || CSS || 615 || align=right | 1.5 km || 
|-id=985 bgcolor=#E9E9E9
| 383985 ||  || — || October 8, 2008 || Mount Lemmon || Mount Lemmon Survey || — || align=right | 2.4 km || 
|-id=986 bgcolor=#E9E9E9
| 383986 ||  || — || October 8, 2008 || Mount Lemmon || Mount Lemmon Survey || — || align=right | 1.5 km || 
|-id=987 bgcolor=#E9E9E9
| 383987 ||  || — || October 8, 2008 || Mount Lemmon || Mount Lemmon Survey || — || align=right | 1.8 km || 
|-id=988 bgcolor=#E9E9E9
| 383988 ||  || — || October 9, 2008 || Kitt Peak || Spacewatch || — || align=right | 2.7 km || 
|-id=989 bgcolor=#E9E9E9
| 383989 ||  || — || October 2, 2008 || Kitt Peak || Spacewatch || — || align=right | 1.2 km || 
|-id=990 bgcolor=#E9E9E9
| 383990 ||  || — || October 6, 2008 || Kitt Peak || Spacewatch || — || align=right | 1.3 km || 
|-id=991 bgcolor=#E9E9E9
| 383991 ||  || — || October 1, 2008 || Kitt Peak || Spacewatch || HEN || align=right data-sort-value="0.94" | 940 m || 
|-id=992 bgcolor=#E9E9E9
| 383992 ||  || — || October 2, 2008 || Mount Lemmon || Mount Lemmon Survey || — || align=right | 1.7 km || 
|-id=993 bgcolor=#E9E9E9
| 383993 ||  || — || October 4, 2008 || Mount Lemmon || Mount Lemmon Survey || — || align=right | 1.8 km || 
|-id=994 bgcolor=#E9E9E9
| 383994 ||  || — || October 6, 2008 || Mount Lemmon || Mount Lemmon Survey || — || align=right | 1.6 km || 
|-id=995 bgcolor=#E9E9E9
| 383995 ||  || — || October 7, 2008 || Kitt Peak || Spacewatch || HOF || align=right | 2.1 km || 
|-id=996 bgcolor=#E9E9E9
| 383996 ||  || — || September 7, 2008 || Catalina || CSS || — || align=right | 3.1 km || 
|-id=997 bgcolor=#E9E9E9
| 383997 ||  || — || October 22, 2008 || Goodricke-Pigott || R. A. Tucker || — || align=right | 2.4 km || 
|-id=998 bgcolor=#E9E9E9
| 383998 ||  || — || October 17, 2008 || Kitt Peak || Spacewatch || NEM || align=right | 2.1 km || 
|-id=999 bgcolor=#E9E9E9
| 383999 ||  || — || October 17, 2008 || Kitt Peak || Spacewatch || — || align=right | 2.2 km || 
|-id=000 bgcolor=#E9E9E9
| 384000 ||  || — || October 17, 2008 || Kitt Peak || Spacewatch || — || align=right | 2.7 km || 
|}

References

External links 
 Discovery Circumstances: Numbered Minor Planets (380001)–(385000) (IAU Minor Planet Center)

0383